

105001–105100 

|-bgcolor=#fefefe
| 105001 ||  || — || May 28, 2000 || Socorro || LINEAR || H || align=right | 1.1 km || 
|-id=002 bgcolor=#E9E9E9
| 105002 ||  || — || May 28, 2000 || Socorro || LINEAR || PAL || align=right | 5.4 km || 
|-id=003 bgcolor=#E9E9E9
| 105003 ||  || — || May 27, 2000 || Socorro || LINEAR || — || align=right | 3.6 km || 
|-id=004 bgcolor=#E9E9E9
| 105004 ||  || — || May 27, 2000 || Socorro || LINEAR || — || align=right | 3.7 km || 
|-id=005 bgcolor=#d6d6d6
| 105005 ||  || — || May 27, 2000 || Socorro || LINEAR || — || align=right | 8.9 km || 
|-id=006 bgcolor=#d6d6d6
| 105006 ||  || — || May 28, 2000 || Socorro || LINEAR || — || align=right | 4.4 km || 
|-id=007 bgcolor=#d6d6d6
| 105007 ||  || — || May 28, 2000 || Socorro || LINEAR || — || align=right | 6.4 km || 
|-id=008 bgcolor=#E9E9E9
| 105008 ||  || — || May 28, 2000 || Socorro || LINEAR || — || align=right | 4.2 km || 
|-id=009 bgcolor=#fefefe
| 105009 ||  || — || May 28, 2000 || Socorro || LINEAR || NYS || align=right | 1.1 km || 
|-id=010 bgcolor=#fefefe
| 105010 ||  || — || May 28, 2000 || Socorro || LINEAR || — || align=right | 3.6 km || 
|-id=011 bgcolor=#fefefe
| 105011 ||  || — || May 28, 2000 || Socorro || LINEAR || — || align=right | 1.6 km || 
|-id=012 bgcolor=#d6d6d6
| 105012 ||  || — || May 28, 2000 || Socorro || LINEAR || — || align=right | 5.1 km || 
|-id=013 bgcolor=#fefefe
| 105013 ||  || — || May 28, 2000 || Socorro || LINEAR || — || align=right | 1.8 km || 
|-id=014 bgcolor=#d6d6d6
| 105014 ||  || — || May 28, 2000 || Socorro || LINEAR || — || align=right | 4.7 km || 
|-id=015 bgcolor=#d6d6d6
| 105015 ||  || — || May 28, 2000 || Socorro || LINEAR || KOR || align=right | 2.6 km || 
|-id=016 bgcolor=#d6d6d6
| 105016 ||  || — || May 28, 2000 || Socorro || LINEAR || EOS || align=right | 3.7 km || 
|-id=017 bgcolor=#d6d6d6
| 105017 ||  || — || May 28, 2000 || Socorro || LINEAR || — || align=right | 3.4 km || 
|-id=018 bgcolor=#d6d6d6
| 105018 ||  || — || May 28, 2000 || Socorro || LINEAR || — || align=right | 3.9 km || 
|-id=019 bgcolor=#E9E9E9
| 105019 ||  || — || May 28, 2000 || Socorro || LINEAR || EUN || align=right | 2.6 km || 
|-id=020 bgcolor=#E9E9E9
| 105020 ||  || — || May 28, 2000 || Socorro || LINEAR || — || align=right | 3.1 km || 
|-id=021 bgcolor=#d6d6d6
| 105021 ||  || — || May 28, 2000 || Socorro || LINEAR || — || align=right | 5.4 km || 
|-id=022 bgcolor=#d6d6d6
| 105022 ||  || — || May 28, 2000 || Socorro || LINEAR || — || align=right | 8.1 km || 
|-id=023 bgcolor=#d6d6d6
| 105023 ||  || — || May 28, 2000 || Socorro || LINEAR || THM || align=right | 6.4 km || 
|-id=024 bgcolor=#d6d6d6
| 105024 ||  || — || May 28, 2000 || Socorro || LINEAR || — || align=right | 4.0 km || 
|-id=025 bgcolor=#d6d6d6
| 105025 ||  || — || May 28, 2000 || Socorro || LINEAR || — || align=right | 7.1 km || 
|-id=026 bgcolor=#d6d6d6
| 105026 ||  || — || May 28, 2000 || Socorro || LINEAR || THM || align=right | 7.3 km || 
|-id=027 bgcolor=#E9E9E9
| 105027 ||  || — || May 28, 2000 || Socorro || LINEAR || — || align=right | 3.3 km || 
|-id=028 bgcolor=#E9E9E9
| 105028 ||  || — || May 28, 2000 || Socorro || LINEAR || — || align=right | 4.1 km || 
|-id=029 bgcolor=#E9E9E9
| 105029 ||  || — || May 28, 2000 || Socorro || LINEAR || — || align=right | 3.8 km || 
|-id=030 bgcolor=#E9E9E9
| 105030 ||  || — || May 27, 2000 || Socorro || LINEAR || — || align=right | 2.4 km || 
|-id=031 bgcolor=#d6d6d6
| 105031 ||  || — || May 27, 2000 || Socorro || LINEAR || TIR || align=right | 3.9 km || 
|-id=032 bgcolor=#d6d6d6
| 105032 ||  || — || May 27, 2000 || Socorro || LINEAR || — || align=right | 6.1 km || 
|-id=033 bgcolor=#E9E9E9
| 105033 ||  || — || May 28, 2000 || Socorro || LINEAR || — || align=right | 4.0 km || 
|-id=034 bgcolor=#d6d6d6
| 105034 ||  || — || May 24, 2000 || Kitt Peak || Spacewatch || — || align=right | 7.0 km || 
|-id=035 bgcolor=#fefefe
| 105035 ||  || — || May 24, 2000 || Kitt Peak || Spacewatch || — || align=right | 1.4 km || 
|-id=036 bgcolor=#d6d6d6
| 105036 ||  || — || May 24, 2000 || Kitt Peak || Spacewatch || — || align=right | 4.3 km || 
|-id=037 bgcolor=#E9E9E9
| 105037 ||  || — || May 24, 2000 || Kitt Peak || Spacewatch || — || align=right | 2.7 km || 
|-id=038 bgcolor=#E9E9E9
| 105038 ||  || — || May 26, 2000 || Kitt Peak || Spacewatch || — || align=right | 2.0 km || 
|-id=039 bgcolor=#d6d6d6
| 105039 ||  || — || May 30, 2000 || Kitt Peak || Spacewatch || EOS || align=right | 5.2 km || 
|-id=040 bgcolor=#E9E9E9
| 105040 ||  || — || May 27, 2000 || Socorro || LINEAR || — || align=right | 2.8 km || 
|-id=041 bgcolor=#d6d6d6
| 105041 ||  || — || May 27, 2000 || Socorro || LINEAR || — || align=right | 7.4 km || 
|-id=042 bgcolor=#d6d6d6
| 105042 ||  || — || May 27, 2000 || Socorro || LINEAR || — || align=right | 4.0 km || 
|-id=043 bgcolor=#d6d6d6
| 105043 ||  || — || May 28, 2000 || Socorro || LINEAR || MEL || align=right | 6.3 km || 
|-id=044 bgcolor=#E9E9E9
| 105044 ||  || — || May 28, 2000 || Socorro || LINEAR || GER || align=right | 4.2 km || 
|-id=045 bgcolor=#E9E9E9
| 105045 ||  || — || May 27, 2000 || Socorro || LINEAR || — || align=right | 2.7 km || 
|-id=046 bgcolor=#E9E9E9
| 105046 ||  || — || May 27, 2000 || Socorro || LINEAR || — || align=right | 3.1 km || 
|-id=047 bgcolor=#d6d6d6
| 105047 ||  || — || May 23, 2000 || Anderson Mesa || LONEOS || — || align=right | 5.2 km || 
|-id=048 bgcolor=#d6d6d6
| 105048 ||  || — || May 24, 2000 || Anderson Mesa || LONEOS || — || align=right | 5.8 km || 
|-id=049 bgcolor=#E9E9E9
| 105049 ||  || — || May 31, 2000 || Kitt Peak || Spacewatch || ADE || align=right | 6.2 km || 
|-id=050 bgcolor=#E9E9E9
| 105050 ||  || — || May 27, 2000 || Anderson Mesa || LONEOS || — || align=right | 3.8 km || 
|-id=051 bgcolor=#E9E9E9
| 105051 ||  || — || May 27, 2000 || Anderson Mesa || LONEOS || — || align=right | 1.9 km || 
|-id=052 bgcolor=#E9E9E9
| 105052 ||  || — || May 27, 2000 || Anderson Mesa || LONEOS || EUN || align=right | 2.7 km || 
|-id=053 bgcolor=#E9E9E9
| 105053 ||  || — || May 27, 2000 || Anderson Mesa || LONEOS || — || align=right | 2.5 km || 
|-id=054 bgcolor=#E9E9E9
| 105054 ||  || — || May 27, 2000 || Socorro || LINEAR || — || align=right | 3.4 km || 
|-id=055 bgcolor=#d6d6d6
| 105055 ||  || — || May 24, 2000 || Anderson Mesa || LONEOS || — || align=right | 3.8 km || 
|-id=056 bgcolor=#d6d6d6
| 105056 ||  || — || May 24, 2000 || Anderson Mesa || LONEOS || — || align=right | 5.6 km || 
|-id=057 bgcolor=#d6d6d6
| 105057 ||  || — || May 25, 2000 || Anderson Mesa || LONEOS || — || align=right | 6.6 km || 
|-id=058 bgcolor=#d6d6d6
| 105058 ||  || — || May 25, 2000 || Anderson Mesa || LONEOS || — || align=right | 6.0 km || 
|-id=059 bgcolor=#fefefe
| 105059 ||  || — || May 25, 2000 || Anderson Mesa || LONEOS || — || align=right | 1.9 km || 
|-id=060 bgcolor=#d6d6d6
| 105060 ||  || — || May 25, 2000 || Anderson Mesa || LONEOS || — || align=right | 4.5 km || 
|-id=061 bgcolor=#E9E9E9
| 105061 ||  || — || May 26, 2000 || Anderson Mesa || LONEOS || PAL || align=right | 5.7 km || 
|-id=062 bgcolor=#E9E9E9
| 105062 ||  || — || May 26, 2000 || Anderson Mesa || LONEOS || — || align=right | 4.0 km || 
|-id=063 bgcolor=#d6d6d6
| 105063 ||  || — || May 26, 2000 || Anderson Mesa || LONEOS || — || align=right | 6.2 km || 
|-id=064 bgcolor=#d6d6d6
| 105064 ||  || — || May 26, 2000 || Anderson Mesa || LONEOS || — || align=right | 6.4 km || 
|-id=065 bgcolor=#E9E9E9
| 105065 ||  || — || May 26, 2000 || Anderson Mesa || LONEOS || MAR || align=right | 3.0 km || 
|-id=066 bgcolor=#d6d6d6
| 105066 ||  || — || May 26, 2000 || Anderson Mesa || LONEOS || — || align=right | 6.9 km || 
|-id=067 bgcolor=#E9E9E9
| 105067 ||  || — || May 27, 2000 || Anderson Mesa || LONEOS || — || align=right | 2.7 km || 
|-id=068 bgcolor=#d6d6d6
| 105068 ||  || — || May 27, 2000 || Anderson Mesa || LONEOS || — || align=right | 7.0 km || 
|-id=069 bgcolor=#E9E9E9
| 105069 ||  || — || May 28, 2000 || Anderson Mesa || LONEOS || BRU || align=right | 4.7 km || 
|-id=070 bgcolor=#d6d6d6
| 105070 ||  || — || May 23, 2000 || Anderson Mesa || LONEOS || — || align=right | 6.7 km || 
|-id=071 bgcolor=#d6d6d6
| 105071 ||  || — || May 30, 2000 || Anderson Mesa || LONEOS || — || align=right | 5.8 km || 
|-id=072 bgcolor=#d6d6d6
| 105072 ||  || — || May 31, 2000 || Anderson Mesa || LONEOS || ALA || align=right | 6.3 km || 
|-id=073 bgcolor=#d6d6d6
| 105073 ||  || — || May 30, 2000 || Kitt Peak || Spacewatch || THM || align=right | 4.1 km || 
|-id=074 bgcolor=#d6d6d6
| 105074 ||  || — || May 30, 2000 || Socorro || LINEAR || ALA || align=right | 6.6 km || 
|-id=075 bgcolor=#d6d6d6
| 105075 ||  || — || May 29, 2000 || Kitt Peak || Spacewatch || — || align=right | 4.2 km || 
|-id=076 bgcolor=#d6d6d6
| 105076 ||  || — || May 28, 2000 || Socorro || LINEAR || LIX || align=right | 8.5 km || 
|-id=077 bgcolor=#d6d6d6
| 105077 ||  || — || May 28, 2000 || Kitt Peak || Spacewatch || — || align=right | 5.9 km || 
|-id=078 bgcolor=#E9E9E9
| 105078 ||  || — || May 28, 2000 || Socorro || LINEAR || — || align=right | 2.5 km || 
|-id=079 bgcolor=#d6d6d6
| 105079 ||  || — || May 27, 2000 || Socorro || LINEAR || — || align=right | 5.9 km || 
|-id=080 bgcolor=#fefefe
| 105080 ||  || — || May 27, 2000 || Socorro || LINEAR || V || align=right | 2.0 km || 
|-id=081 bgcolor=#d6d6d6
| 105081 ||  || — || May 27, 2000 || Socorro || LINEAR || ALA || align=right | 6.9 km || 
|-id=082 bgcolor=#d6d6d6
| 105082 ||  || — || May 27, 2000 || Socorro || LINEAR || — || align=right | 5.4 km || 
|-id=083 bgcolor=#E9E9E9
| 105083 ||  || — || May 27, 2000 || Socorro || LINEAR || — || align=right | 3.0 km || 
|-id=084 bgcolor=#E9E9E9
| 105084 ||  || — || May 27, 2000 || Anderson Mesa || LONEOS || 526 || align=right | 4.6 km || 
|-id=085 bgcolor=#d6d6d6
| 105085 ||  || — || May 27, 2000 || Socorro || LINEAR || EMA || align=right | 6.7 km || 
|-id=086 bgcolor=#E9E9E9
| 105086 ||  || — || May 27, 2000 || Socorro || LINEAR || — || align=right | 2.8 km || 
|-id=087 bgcolor=#d6d6d6
| 105087 ||  || — || May 27, 2000 || Socorro || LINEAR || — || align=right | 6.0 km || 
|-id=088 bgcolor=#E9E9E9
| 105088 ||  || — || May 25, 2000 || Anderson Mesa || LONEOS || — || align=right | 2.2 km || 
|-id=089 bgcolor=#d6d6d6
| 105089 ||  || — || May 24, 2000 || Anderson Mesa || LONEOS || — || align=right | 7.9 km || 
|-id=090 bgcolor=#d6d6d6
| 105090 ||  || — || May 26, 2000 || Anderson Mesa || LONEOS || — || align=right | 6.1 km || 
|-id=091 bgcolor=#d6d6d6
| 105091 || 2000 LO || — || June 2, 2000 || Reedy Creek || J. Broughton || HYG || align=right | 6.0 km || 
|-id=092 bgcolor=#d6d6d6
| 105092 ||  || — || June 1, 2000 || Črni Vrh || Črni Vrh || — || align=right | 5.8 km || 
|-id=093 bgcolor=#d6d6d6
| 105093 ||  || — || June 1, 2000 || Črni Vrh || Črni Vrh || — || align=right | 5.9 km || 
|-id=094 bgcolor=#d6d6d6
| 105094 ||  || — || June 1, 2000 || Bergisch Gladbach || W. Bickel || EOS || align=right | 4.9 km || 
|-id=095 bgcolor=#E9E9E9
| 105095 ||  || — || June 1, 2000 || Bergisch Gladbach || W. Bickel || DOR || align=right | 4.5 km || 
|-id=096 bgcolor=#E9E9E9
| 105096 ||  || — || June 4, 2000 || Socorro || LINEAR || — || align=right | 7.9 km || 
|-id=097 bgcolor=#E9E9E9
| 105097 ||  || — || June 4, 2000 || Socorro || LINEAR || RAF || align=right | 1.9 km || 
|-id=098 bgcolor=#E9E9E9
| 105098 ||  || — || June 4, 2000 || Kitt Peak || Spacewatch || — || align=right | 2.2 km || 
|-id=099 bgcolor=#d6d6d6
| 105099 ||  || — || June 5, 2000 || Kitt Peak || Spacewatch || — || align=right | 6.0 km || 
|-id=100 bgcolor=#E9E9E9
| 105100 ||  || — || June 5, 2000 || Socorro || LINEAR || ADE || align=right | 5.6 km || 
|}

105101–105200 

|-bgcolor=#d6d6d6
| 105101 ||  || — || June 5, 2000 || Socorro || LINEAR || TIR || align=right | 7.3 km || 
|-id=102 bgcolor=#E9E9E9
| 105102 ||  || — || June 4, 2000 || Socorro || LINEAR || — || align=right | 3.8 km || 
|-id=103 bgcolor=#E9E9E9
| 105103 ||  || — || June 4, 2000 || Socorro || LINEAR || — || align=right | 3.1 km || 
|-id=104 bgcolor=#E9E9E9
| 105104 ||  || — || June 4, 2000 || Socorro || LINEAR || — || align=right | 2.9 km || 
|-id=105 bgcolor=#d6d6d6
| 105105 ||  || — || June 6, 2000 || Socorro || LINEAR || — || align=right | 9.3 km || 
|-id=106 bgcolor=#FA8072
| 105106 ||  || — || June 7, 2000 || Socorro || LINEAR || — || align=right | 1.9 km || 
|-id=107 bgcolor=#d6d6d6
| 105107 ||  || — || June 2, 2000 || Siding Spring || R. H. McNaught || EUP || align=right | 9.6 km || 
|-id=108 bgcolor=#E9E9E9
| 105108 ||  || — || June 7, 2000 || Kitt Peak || Spacewatch || — || align=right | 4.6 km || 
|-id=109 bgcolor=#fefefe
| 105109 ||  || — || June 1, 2000 || Anderson Mesa || LONEOS || H || align=right | 1.1 km || 
|-id=110 bgcolor=#E9E9E9
| 105110 ||  || — || June 4, 2000 || Socorro || LINEAR || — || align=right | 3.0 km || 
|-id=111 bgcolor=#E9E9E9
| 105111 ||  || — || June 8, 2000 || Socorro || LINEAR || GEF || align=right | 2.7 km || 
|-id=112 bgcolor=#d6d6d6
| 105112 ||  || — || June 8, 2000 || Socorro || LINEAR || — || align=right | 4.4 km || 
|-id=113 bgcolor=#d6d6d6
| 105113 ||  || — || June 8, 2000 || Socorro || LINEAR || — || align=right | 8.5 km || 
|-id=114 bgcolor=#d6d6d6
| 105114 ||  || — || June 8, 2000 || Socorro || LINEAR || — || align=right | 11 km || 
|-id=115 bgcolor=#d6d6d6
| 105115 ||  || — || June 8, 2000 || Socorro || LINEAR || AEG || align=right | 5.1 km || 
|-id=116 bgcolor=#d6d6d6
| 105116 ||  || — || June 6, 2000 || Kitt Peak || Spacewatch || — || align=right | 5.1 km || 
|-id=117 bgcolor=#E9E9E9
| 105117 ||  || — || June 1, 2000 || Socorro || LINEAR || — || align=right | 7.1 km || 
|-id=118 bgcolor=#E9E9E9
| 105118 ||  || — || June 1, 2000 || Socorro || LINEAR || — || align=right | 5.7 km || 
|-id=119 bgcolor=#d6d6d6
| 105119 ||  || — || June 1, 2000 || Socorro || LINEAR || ALA || align=right | 9.4 km || 
|-id=120 bgcolor=#E9E9E9
| 105120 ||  || — || June 1, 2000 || Socorro || LINEAR || — || align=right | 4.3 km || 
|-id=121 bgcolor=#d6d6d6
| 105121 ||  || — || June 5, 2000 || Anderson Mesa || LONEOS || — || align=right | 7.1 km || 
|-id=122 bgcolor=#fefefe
| 105122 ||  || — || June 5, 2000 || Anderson Mesa || LONEOS || H || align=right | 1.4 km || 
|-id=123 bgcolor=#d6d6d6
| 105123 ||  || — || June 1, 2000 || Kitt Peak || Spacewatch || — || align=right | 4.8 km || 
|-id=124 bgcolor=#E9E9E9
| 105124 ||  || — || June 1, 2000 || Haleakala || NEAT || — || align=right | 3.5 km || 
|-id=125 bgcolor=#E9E9E9
| 105125 ||  || — || June 1, 2000 || Haleakala || NEAT || EUN || align=right | 2.3 km || 
|-id=126 bgcolor=#fefefe
| 105126 ||  || — || June 24, 2000 || Socorro || LINEAR || — || align=right | 5.9 km || 
|-id=127 bgcolor=#E9E9E9
| 105127 ||  || — || June 25, 2000 || Socorro || LINEAR || — || align=right | 7.4 km || 
|-id=128 bgcolor=#E9E9E9
| 105128 ||  || — || June 27, 2000 || Reedy Creek || J. Broughton || EUN || align=right | 3.0 km || 
|-id=129 bgcolor=#d6d6d6
| 105129 ||  || — || June 29, 2000 || Reedy Creek || J. Broughton || — || align=right | 4.7 km || 
|-id=130 bgcolor=#d6d6d6
| 105130 ||  || — || June 24, 2000 || Haleakala || NEAT || — || align=right | 5.5 km || 
|-id=131 bgcolor=#d6d6d6
| 105131 ||  || — || June 29, 2000 || Farpoint || G. Hug || VER || align=right | 6.0 km || 
|-id=132 bgcolor=#E9E9E9
| 105132 ||  || — || June 24, 2000 || Kitt Peak || Spacewatch || — || align=right | 3.4 km || 
|-id=133 bgcolor=#fefefe
| 105133 || 2000 NA || — || July 1, 2000 || Kitt Peak || Spacewatch || — || align=right | 1.9 km || 
|-id=134 bgcolor=#E9E9E9
| 105134 ||  || — || July 3, 2000 || Kitt Peak || Spacewatch || AGN || align=right | 1.8 km || 
|-id=135 bgcolor=#E9E9E9
| 105135 ||  || — || July 4, 2000 || Kitt Peak || Spacewatch || — || align=right | 4.8 km || 
|-id=136 bgcolor=#E9E9E9
| 105136 ||  || — || July 3, 2000 || Kitt Peak || Spacewatch || AGN || align=right | 2.6 km || 
|-id=137 bgcolor=#d6d6d6
| 105137 ||  || — || July 8, 2000 || Bisei SG Center || BATTeRS || YAK || align=right | 9.1 km || 
|-id=138 bgcolor=#E9E9E9
| 105138 ||  || — || July 4, 2000 || Kitt Peak || Spacewatch || NEM || align=right | 3.3 km || 
|-id=139 bgcolor=#E9E9E9
| 105139 ||  || — || July 4, 2000 || Kitt Peak || Spacewatch || — || align=right | 2.9 km || 
|-id=140 bgcolor=#FFC2E0
| 105140 ||  || — || July 10, 2000 || Socorro || LINEAR || ATE +1km || align=right | 1.9 km || 
|-id=141 bgcolor=#FFC2E0
| 105141 ||  || — || July 7, 2000 || Socorro || LINEAR || AMO || align=right data-sort-value="0.35" | 350 m || 
|-id=142 bgcolor=#d6d6d6
| 105142 ||  || — || July 4, 2000 || Anderson Mesa || LONEOS || — || align=right | 3.5 km || 
|-id=143 bgcolor=#d6d6d6
| 105143 ||  || — || July 5, 2000 || Anderson Mesa || LONEOS || — || align=right | 9.7 km || 
|-id=144 bgcolor=#d6d6d6
| 105144 ||  || — || July 5, 2000 || Anderson Mesa || LONEOS || — || align=right | 7.5 km || 
|-id=145 bgcolor=#fefefe
| 105145 ||  || — || July 5, 2000 || Anderson Mesa || LONEOS || — || align=right | 1.3 km || 
|-id=146 bgcolor=#E9E9E9
| 105146 ||  || — || July 5, 2000 || Anderson Mesa || LONEOS || EUN || align=right | 3.1 km || 
|-id=147 bgcolor=#fefefe
| 105147 ||  || — || July 5, 2000 || Anderson Mesa || LONEOS || FLO || align=right | 1.3 km || 
|-id=148 bgcolor=#E9E9E9
| 105148 ||  || — || July 5, 2000 || Anderson Mesa || LONEOS || — || align=right | 3.4 km || 
|-id=149 bgcolor=#E9E9E9
| 105149 ||  || — || July 5, 2000 || Anderson Mesa || LONEOS || MRX || align=right | 2.4 km || 
|-id=150 bgcolor=#E9E9E9
| 105150 ||  || — || July 5, 2000 || Anderson Mesa || LONEOS || DOR || align=right | 6.1 km || 
|-id=151 bgcolor=#d6d6d6
| 105151 ||  || — || July 7, 2000 || Anderson Mesa || LONEOS || — || align=right | 9.1 km || 
|-id=152 bgcolor=#d6d6d6
| 105152 ||  || — || July 4, 2000 || Anderson Mesa || LONEOS || — || align=right | 12 km || 
|-id=153 bgcolor=#E9E9E9
| 105153 ||  || — || July 4, 2000 || Anderson Mesa || LONEOS || — || align=right | 5.8 km || 
|-id=154 bgcolor=#E9E9E9
| 105154 ||  || — || July 4, 2000 || Anderson Mesa || LONEOS || — || align=right | 5.5 km || 
|-id=155 bgcolor=#fefefe
| 105155 ||  || — || July 4, 2000 || Anderson Mesa || LONEOS || H || align=right | 1.9 km || 
|-id=156 bgcolor=#fefefe
| 105156 ||  || — || July 4, 2000 || Anderson Mesa || LONEOS || — || align=right | 1.6 km || 
|-id=157 bgcolor=#d6d6d6
| 105157 ||  || — || July 3, 2000 || Socorro || LINEAR || — || align=right | 8.2 km || 
|-id=158 bgcolor=#FA8072
| 105158 || 2000 OL || — || July 23, 2000 || Socorro || LINEAR || — || align=right | 8.0 km || 
|-id=159 bgcolor=#E9E9E9
| 105159 ||  || — || July 24, 2000 || Socorro || LINEAR || POS || align=right | 5.6 km || 
|-id=160 bgcolor=#fefefe
| 105160 ||  || — || July 24, 2000 || Socorro || LINEAR || — || align=right | 2.0 km || 
|-id=161 bgcolor=#E9E9E9
| 105161 ||  || — || July 24, 2000 || Socorro || LINEAR || — || align=right | 6.7 km || 
|-id=162 bgcolor=#d6d6d6
| 105162 ||  || — || July 31, 2000 || Socorro || LINEAR || TIR || align=right | 7.3 km || 
|-id=163 bgcolor=#fefefe
| 105163 ||  || — || July 23, 2000 || Socorro || LINEAR || — || align=right | 1.8 km || 
|-id=164 bgcolor=#fefefe
| 105164 ||  || — || July 23, 2000 || Socorro || LINEAR || — || align=right | 2.0 km || 
|-id=165 bgcolor=#E9E9E9
| 105165 ||  || — || July 23, 2000 || Socorro || LINEAR || EUN || align=right | 2.6 km || 
|-id=166 bgcolor=#E9E9E9
| 105166 ||  || — || July 23, 2000 || Socorro || LINEAR || — || align=right | 5.5 km || 
|-id=167 bgcolor=#E9E9E9
| 105167 ||  || — || July 23, 2000 || Socorro || LINEAR || — || align=right | 3.4 km || 
|-id=168 bgcolor=#d6d6d6
| 105168 ||  || — || July 23, 2000 || Socorro || LINEAR || — || align=right | 3.4 km || 
|-id=169 bgcolor=#fefefe
| 105169 ||  || — || July 23, 2000 || Socorro || LINEAR || — || align=right | 1.8 km || 
|-id=170 bgcolor=#d6d6d6
| 105170 ||  || — || July 23, 2000 || Socorro || LINEAR || — || align=right | 6.6 km || 
|-id=171 bgcolor=#d6d6d6
| 105171 ||  || — || July 23, 2000 || Socorro || LINEAR || — || align=right | 5.9 km || 
|-id=172 bgcolor=#d6d6d6
| 105172 ||  || — || July 31, 2000 || Socorro || LINEAR || — || align=right | 8.1 km || 
|-id=173 bgcolor=#fefefe
| 105173 ||  || — || July 30, 2000 || Socorro || LINEAR || H || align=right | 2.7 km || 
|-id=174 bgcolor=#fefefe
| 105174 ||  || — || July 31, 2000 || Socorro || LINEAR || H || align=right | 2.2 km || 
|-id=175 bgcolor=#FA8072
| 105175 ||  || — || July 31, 2000 || Socorro || LINEAR || — || align=right | 2.3 km || 
|-id=176 bgcolor=#E9E9E9
| 105176 ||  || — || July 23, 2000 || Socorro || LINEAR || — || align=right | 3.9 km || 
|-id=177 bgcolor=#E9E9E9
| 105177 ||  || — || July 23, 2000 || Socorro || LINEAR || — || align=right | 4.1 km || 
|-id=178 bgcolor=#E9E9E9
| 105178 ||  || — || July 23, 2000 || Socorro || LINEAR || — || align=right | 4.3 km || 
|-id=179 bgcolor=#E9E9E9
| 105179 ||  || — || July 30, 2000 || Socorro || LINEAR || — || align=right | 5.1 km || 
|-id=180 bgcolor=#E9E9E9
| 105180 ||  || — || July 30, 2000 || Socorro || LINEAR || HNS || align=right | 3.0 km || 
|-id=181 bgcolor=#E9E9E9
| 105181 ||  || — || July 30, 2000 || Socorro || LINEAR || MAR || align=right | 3.2 km || 
|-id=182 bgcolor=#d6d6d6
| 105182 ||  || — || July 30, 2000 || Socorro || LINEAR || — || align=right | 7.2 km || 
|-id=183 bgcolor=#E9E9E9
| 105183 ||  || — || July 30, 2000 || Socorro || LINEAR || — || align=right | 4.5 km || 
|-id=184 bgcolor=#fefefe
| 105184 ||  || — || July 30, 2000 || Socorro || LINEAR || — || align=right | 3.0 km || 
|-id=185 bgcolor=#E9E9E9
| 105185 ||  || — || July 30, 2000 || Socorro || LINEAR || — || align=right | 4.0 km || 
|-id=186 bgcolor=#E9E9E9
| 105186 ||  || — || July 30, 2000 || Socorro || LINEAR || DOR || align=right | 6.5 km || 
|-id=187 bgcolor=#fefefe
| 105187 ||  || — || July 30, 2000 || Socorro || LINEAR || FLO || align=right | 1.8 km || 
|-id=188 bgcolor=#d6d6d6
| 105188 ||  || — || July 30, 2000 || Socorro || LINEAR || — || align=right | 6.2 km || 
|-id=189 bgcolor=#E9E9E9
| 105189 ||  || — || July 30, 2000 || Socorro || LINEAR || GEF || align=right | 2.9 km || 
|-id=190 bgcolor=#E9E9E9
| 105190 ||  || — || July 30, 2000 || Socorro || LINEAR || — || align=right | 5.2 km || 
|-id=191 bgcolor=#fefefe
| 105191 ||  || — || July 31, 2000 || Socorro || LINEAR || — || align=right | 1.7 km || 
|-id=192 bgcolor=#E9E9E9
| 105192 ||  || — || July 30, 2000 || Socorro || LINEAR || — || align=right | 6.1 km || 
|-id=193 bgcolor=#d6d6d6
| 105193 ||  || — || July 30, 2000 || Socorro || LINEAR || — || align=right | 6.0 km || 
|-id=194 bgcolor=#d6d6d6
| 105194 ||  || — || July 30, 2000 || Socorro || LINEAR || — || align=right | 9.1 km || 
|-id=195 bgcolor=#d6d6d6
| 105195 ||  || — || July 30, 2000 || Socorro || LINEAR || — || align=right | 4.9 km || 
|-id=196 bgcolor=#E9E9E9
| 105196 ||  || — || July 30, 2000 || Socorro || LINEAR || EUN || align=right | 2.7 km || 
|-id=197 bgcolor=#E9E9E9
| 105197 ||  || — || July 30, 2000 || Socorro || LINEAR || — || align=right | 5.1 km || 
|-id=198 bgcolor=#E9E9E9
| 105198 ||  || — || July 30, 2000 || Socorro || LINEAR || — || align=right | 4.8 km || 
|-id=199 bgcolor=#E9E9E9
| 105199 ||  || — || July 30, 2000 || Socorro || LINEAR || — || align=right | 4.1 km || 
|-id=200 bgcolor=#fefefe
| 105200 ||  || — || July 30, 2000 || Socorro || LINEAR || — || align=right | 1.5 km || 
|}

105201–105300 

|-bgcolor=#E9E9E9
| 105201 ||  || — || July 30, 2000 || Socorro || LINEAR || — || align=right | 8.5 km || 
|-id=202 bgcolor=#d6d6d6
| 105202 ||  || — || July 30, 2000 || Socorro || LINEAR || MEL || align=right | 5.6 km || 
|-id=203 bgcolor=#d6d6d6
| 105203 ||  || — || July 30, 2000 || Socorro || LINEAR || SYL7:4 || align=right | 11 km || 
|-id=204 bgcolor=#E9E9E9
| 105204 ||  || — || July 30, 2000 || Socorro || LINEAR || — || align=right | 5.2 km || 
|-id=205 bgcolor=#d6d6d6
| 105205 ||  || — || July 30, 2000 || Socorro || LINEAR || TRP || align=right | 5.3 km || 
|-id=206 bgcolor=#fefefe
| 105206 ||  || — || July 30, 2000 || Socorro || LINEAR || — || align=right | 1.9 km || 
|-id=207 bgcolor=#d6d6d6
| 105207 ||  || — || July 31, 2000 || Socorro || LINEAR || — || align=right | 6.3 km || 
|-id=208 bgcolor=#FA8072
| 105208 ||  || — || July 31, 2000 || Socorro || LINEAR || — || align=right | 1.0 km || 
|-id=209 bgcolor=#E9E9E9
| 105209 ||  || — || July 31, 2000 || Socorro || LINEAR || — || align=right | 7.4 km || 
|-id=210 bgcolor=#d6d6d6
| 105210 ||  || — || July 30, 2000 || Socorro || LINEAR || — || align=right | 12 km || 
|-id=211 bgcolor=#fefefe
| 105211 Sanden ||  ||  || July 29, 2000 || Siding Spring || R. H. McNaught || H || align=right | 1.5 km || 
|-id=212 bgcolor=#E9E9E9
| 105212 ||  || — || July 31, 2000 || Socorro || LINEAR || — || align=right | 7.0 km || 
|-id=213 bgcolor=#d6d6d6
| 105213 ||  || — || July 31, 2000 || Socorro || LINEAR || — || align=right | 11 km || 
|-id=214 bgcolor=#E9E9E9
| 105214 ||  || — || July 29, 2000 || Anderson Mesa || LONEOS || — || align=right | 4.3 km || 
|-id=215 bgcolor=#E9E9E9
| 105215 ||  || — || July 29, 2000 || Anderson Mesa || LONEOS || — || align=right | 3.9 km || 
|-id=216 bgcolor=#E9E9E9
| 105216 ||  || — || July 29, 2000 || Anderson Mesa || LONEOS || NEM || align=right | 5.5 km || 
|-id=217 bgcolor=#fefefe
| 105217 ||  || — || July 29, 2000 || Anderson Mesa || LONEOS || H || align=right data-sort-value="0.88" | 880 m || 
|-id=218 bgcolor=#E9E9E9
| 105218 ||  || — || July 29, 2000 || Anderson Mesa || LONEOS || — || align=right | 4.4 km || 
|-id=219 bgcolor=#d6d6d6
| 105219 ||  || — || July 29, 2000 || Anderson Mesa || LONEOS || YAK || align=right | 5.9 km || 
|-id=220 bgcolor=#d6d6d6
| 105220 ||  || — || July 29, 2000 || Anderson Mesa || LONEOS || — || align=right | 3.6 km || 
|-id=221 bgcolor=#E9E9E9
| 105221 ||  || — || July 29, 2000 || Anderson Mesa || LONEOS || — || align=right | 4.6 km || 
|-id=222 bgcolor=#fefefe
| 105222 Oscarsaa ||  ||  || July 31, 2000 || Cerro Tololo || M. W. Buie || FLO || align=right | 1.4 km || 
|-id=223 bgcolor=#fefefe
| 105223 || 2000 PJ || — || August 1, 2000 || Bergisch Gladbach || W. Bickel || NYS || align=right data-sort-value="0.89" | 890 m || 
|-id=224 bgcolor=#E9E9E9
| 105224 ||  || — || August 1, 2000 || Socorro || LINEAR || — || align=right | 5.5 km || 
|-id=225 bgcolor=#E9E9E9
| 105225 ||  || — || August 1, 2000 || Socorro || LINEAR || — || align=right | 7.0 km || 
|-id=226 bgcolor=#E9E9E9
| 105226 ||  || — || August 2, 2000 || Socorro || LINEAR || — || align=right | 4.1 km || 
|-id=227 bgcolor=#d6d6d6
| 105227 ||  || — || August 5, 2000 || Prescott || P. G. Comba || — || align=right | 6.6 km || 
|-id=228 bgcolor=#E9E9E9
| 105228 ||  || — || August 4, 2000 || Bergisch Gladbach || W. Bickel || — || align=right | 3.5 km || 
|-id=229 bgcolor=#d6d6d6
| 105229 ||  || — || August 3, 2000 || Socorro || LINEAR || TIR || align=right | 6.9 km || 
|-id=230 bgcolor=#E9E9E9
| 105230 ||  || — || August 1, 2000 || Socorro || LINEAR || — || align=right | 2.8 km || 
|-id=231 bgcolor=#E9E9E9
| 105231 ||  || — || August 1, 2000 || Socorro || LINEAR || GEF || align=right | 3.0 km || 
|-id=232 bgcolor=#d6d6d6
| 105232 ||  || — || August 1, 2000 || Socorro || LINEAR || EUP || align=right | 11 km || 
|-id=233 bgcolor=#E9E9E9
| 105233 ||  || — || August 2, 2000 || Socorro || LINEAR || — || align=right | 3.2 km || 
|-id=234 bgcolor=#fefefe
| 105234 ||  || — || August 10, 2000 || Socorro || LINEAR || — || align=right | 2.8 km || 
|-id=235 bgcolor=#E9E9E9
| 105235 ||  || — || August 1, 2000 || Socorro || LINEAR || — || align=right | 4.9 km || 
|-id=236 bgcolor=#d6d6d6
| 105236 ||  || — || August 1, 2000 || Socorro || LINEAR || — || align=right | 2.7 km || 
|-id=237 bgcolor=#fefefe
| 105237 ||  || — || August 1, 2000 || Socorro || LINEAR || NYS || align=right | 3.1 km || 
|-id=238 bgcolor=#E9E9E9
| 105238 ||  || — || August 1, 2000 || Socorro || LINEAR || HOF || align=right | 5.5 km || 
|-id=239 bgcolor=#d6d6d6
| 105239 ||  || — || August 1, 2000 || Socorro || LINEAR || KOR || align=right | 2.8 km || 
|-id=240 bgcolor=#fefefe
| 105240 ||  || — || August 1, 2000 || Socorro || LINEAR || V || align=right | 1.3 km || 
|-id=241 bgcolor=#d6d6d6
| 105241 ||  || — || August 3, 2000 || Socorro || LINEAR || BRA || align=right | 2.9 km || 
|-id=242 bgcolor=#fefefe
| 105242 ||  || — || August 3, 2000 || Socorro || LINEAR || — || align=right | 2.1 km || 
|-id=243 bgcolor=#d6d6d6
| 105243 ||  || — || August 4, 2000 || Haleakala || NEAT || — || align=right | 11 km || 
|-id=244 bgcolor=#d6d6d6
| 105244 ||  || — || August 5, 2000 || Haleakala || NEAT || ALA || align=right | 6.8 km || 
|-id=245 bgcolor=#E9E9E9
| 105245 ||  || — || August 3, 2000 || Kitt Peak || Spacewatch || EUN || align=right | 3.0 km || 
|-id=246 bgcolor=#FA8072
| 105246 ||  || — || August 24, 2000 || Socorro || LINEAR || H || align=right | 1.7 km || 
|-id=247 bgcolor=#fefefe
| 105247 ||  || — || August 24, 2000 || Socorro || LINEAR || — || align=right | 1.6 km || 
|-id=248 bgcolor=#d6d6d6
| 105248 ||  || — || August 24, 2000 || Socorro || LINEAR || — || align=right | 5.4 km || 
|-id=249 bgcolor=#fefefe
| 105249 ||  || — || August 24, 2000 || Socorro || LINEAR || FLO || align=right | 1.3 km || 
|-id=250 bgcolor=#fefefe
| 105250 ||  || — || August 24, 2000 || Starkenburg Observatory || Starkenburg Obs. || — || align=right | 1.5 km || 
|-id=251 bgcolor=#d6d6d6
| 105251 ||  || — || August 24, 2000 || Gnosca || S. Sposetti || — || align=right | 7.9 km || 
|-id=252 bgcolor=#fefefe
| 105252 ||  || — || August 24, 2000 || Socorro || LINEAR || H || align=right | 1.5 km || 
|-id=253 bgcolor=#fefefe
| 105253 ||  || — || August 24, 2000 || Socorro || LINEAR || — || align=right | 1.7 km || 
|-id=254 bgcolor=#E9E9E9
| 105254 ||  || — || August 24, 2000 || Socorro || LINEAR || NEM || align=right | 5.5 km || 
|-id=255 bgcolor=#d6d6d6
| 105255 ||  || — || August 24, 2000 || Socorro || LINEAR || — || align=right | 6.5 km || 
|-id=256 bgcolor=#fefefe
| 105256 ||  || — || August 24, 2000 || Socorro || LINEAR || NYS || align=right | 1.1 km || 
|-id=257 bgcolor=#fefefe
| 105257 ||  || — || August 24, 2000 || Socorro || LINEAR || — || align=right | 1.2 km || 
|-id=258 bgcolor=#fefefe
| 105258 ||  || — || August 24, 2000 || Socorro || LINEAR || MAS || align=right | 1.2 km || 
|-id=259 bgcolor=#E9E9E9
| 105259 ||  || — || August 24, 2000 || Socorro || LINEAR || — || align=right | 4.1 km || 
|-id=260 bgcolor=#E9E9E9
| 105260 ||  || — || August 24, 2000 || Socorro || LINEAR || — || align=right | 4.8 km || 
|-id=261 bgcolor=#d6d6d6
| 105261 ||  || — || August 24, 2000 || Socorro || LINEAR || — || align=right | 4.4 km || 
|-id=262 bgcolor=#E9E9E9
| 105262 ||  || — || August 24, 2000 || Socorro || LINEAR || — || align=right | 4.2 km || 
|-id=263 bgcolor=#d6d6d6
| 105263 ||  || — || August 24, 2000 || Socorro || LINEAR || — || align=right | 6.5 km || 
|-id=264 bgcolor=#E9E9E9
| 105264 ||  || — || August 24, 2000 || Socorro || LINEAR || — || align=right | 5.2 km || 
|-id=265 bgcolor=#d6d6d6
| 105265 ||  || — || August 24, 2000 || Socorro || LINEAR || KAR || align=right | 2.3 km || 
|-id=266 bgcolor=#fefefe
| 105266 ||  || — || August 24, 2000 || Socorro || LINEAR || V || align=right | 1.3 km || 
|-id=267 bgcolor=#fefefe
| 105267 ||  || — || August 24, 2000 || Socorro || LINEAR || FLO || align=right | 1.1 km || 
|-id=268 bgcolor=#E9E9E9
| 105268 ||  || — || August 25, 2000 || Socorro || LINEAR || — || align=right | 2.3 km || 
|-id=269 bgcolor=#d6d6d6
| 105269 ||  || — || August 25, 2000 || Socorro || LINEAR || — || align=right | 4.3 km || 
|-id=270 bgcolor=#fefefe
| 105270 ||  || — || August 25, 2000 || Socorro || LINEAR || — || align=right | 1.2 km || 
|-id=271 bgcolor=#fefefe
| 105271 ||  || — || August 25, 2000 || Socorro || LINEAR || — || align=right | 1.7 km || 
|-id=272 bgcolor=#fefefe
| 105272 ||  || — || August 26, 2000 || Emerald Lane || L. Ball || V || align=right | 1.4 km || 
|-id=273 bgcolor=#E9E9E9
| 105273 ||  || — || August 26, 2000 || Socorro || LINEAR || — || align=right | 2.7 km || 
|-id=274 bgcolor=#fefefe
| 105274 ||  || — || August 24, 2000 || Socorro || LINEAR || NYS || align=right | 1.5 km || 
|-id=275 bgcolor=#d6d6d6
| 105275 ||  || — || August 24, 2000 || Socorro || LINEAR || — || align=right | 6.1 km || 
|-id=276 bgcolor=#d6d6d6
| 105276 ||  || — || August 25, 2000 || Socorro || LINEAR || — || align=right | 8.4 km || 
|-id=277 bgcolor=#d6d6d6
| 105277 ||  || — || August 26, 2000 || Socorro || LINEAR || — || align=right | 9.5 km || 
|-id=278 bgcolor=#d6d6d6
| 105278 ||  || — || August 26, 2000 || Socorro || LINEAR || — || align=right | 6.0 km || 
|-id=279 bgcolor=#fefefe
| 105279 ||  || — || August 26, 2000 || Socorro || LINEAR || H || align=right | 1.1 km || 
|-id=280 bgcolor=#d6d6d6
| 105280 ||  || — || August 28, 2000 || Ondřejov || P. Kušnirák || — || align=right | 5.6 km || 
|-id=281 bgcolor=#E9E9E9
| 105281 ||  || — || August 24, 2000 || Socorro || LINEAR || — || align=right | 3.9 km || 
|-id=282 bgcolor=#E9E9E9
| 105282 ||  || — || August 24, 2000 || Socorro || LINEAR || EUN || align=right | 2.6 km || 
|-id=283 bgcolor=#fefefe
| 105283 ||  || — || August 24, 2000 || Socorro || LINEAR || — || align=right | 1.4 km || 
|-id=284 bgcolor=#d6d6d6
| 105284 ||  || — || August 24, 2000 || Socorro || LINEAR || — || align=right | 2.8 km || 
|-id=285 bgcolor=#d6d6d6
| 105285 ||  || — || August 24, 2000 || Socorro || LINEAR || — || align=right | 4.6 km || 
|-id=286 bgcolor=#d6d6d6
| 105286 ||  || — || August 24, 2000 || Socorro || LINEAR || — || align=right | 5.8 km || 
|-id=287 bgcolor=#fefefe
| 105287 ||  || — || August 24, 2000 || Socorro || LINEAR || — || align=right | 1.5 km || 
|-id=288 bgcolor=#d6d6d6
| 105288 ||  || — || August 24, 2000 || Socorro || LINEAR || — || align=right | 3.4 km || 
|-id=289 bgcolor=#fefefe
| 105289 ||  || — || August 24, 2000 || Socorro || LINEAR || — || align=right | 1.8 km || 
|-id=290 bgcolor=#d6d6d6
| 105290 ||  || — || August 24, 2000 || Socorro || LINEAR || — || align=right | 7.4 km || 
|-id=291 bgcolor=#d6d6d6
| 105291 ||  || — || August 24, 2000 || Socorro || LINEAR || — || align=right | 7.1 km || 
|-id=292 bgcolor=#fefefe
| 105292 ||  || — || August 24, 2000 || Socorro || LINEAR || — || align=right | 1.0 km || 
|-id=293 bgcolor=#E9E9E9
| 105293 ||  || — || August 24, 2000 || Socorro || LINEAR || — || align=right | 3.0 km || 
|-id=294 bgcolor=#fefefe
| 105294 ||  || — || August 24, 2000 || Socorro || LINEAR || — || align=right | 1.4 km || 
|-id=295 bgcolor=#fefefe
| 105295 ||  || — || August 24, 2000 || Socorro || LINEAR || MAS || align=right | 1.5 km || 
|-id=296 bgcolor=#d6d6d6
| 105296 ||  || — || August 24, 2000 || Socorro || LINEAR || KOR || align=right | 3.0 km || 
|-id=297 bgcolor=#fefefe
| 105297 ||  || — || August 24, 2000 || Socorro || LINEAR || V || align=right | 1.2 km || 
|-id=298 bgcolor=#E9E9E9
| 105298 ||  || — || August 25, 2000 || Socorro || LINEAR || — || align=right | 7.2 km || 
|-id=299 bgcolor=#fefefe
| 105299 ||  || — || August 25, 2000 || Socorro || LINEAR || FLO || align=right | 1.6 km || 
|-id=300 bgcolor=#fefefe
| 105300 ||  || — || August 25, 2000 || Socorro || LINEAR || NYS || align=right | 3.3 km || 
|}

105301–105400 

|-bgcolor=#fefefe
| 105301 ||  || — || August 25, 2000 || Socorro || LINEAR || — || align=right | 3.5 km || 
|-id=302 bgcolor=#d6d6d6
| 105302 ||  || — || August 26, 2000 || Socorro || LINEAR || — || align=right | 3.0 km || 
|-id=303 bgcolor=#E9E9E9
| 105303 ||  || — || August 26, 2000 || Socorro || LINEAR || EUN || align=right | 3.0 km || 
|-id=304 bgcolor=#E9E9E9
| 105304 ||  || — || August 26, 2000 || Socorro || LINEAR || — || align=right | 4.1 km || 
|-id=305 bgcolor=#d6d6d6
| 105305 ||  || — || August 26, 2000 || Socorro || LINEAR || TEL || align=right | 2.8 km || 
|-id=306 bgcolor=#d6d6d6
| 105306 ||  || — || August 26, 2000 || Socorro || LINEAR || EMA || align=right | 6.1 km || 
|-id=307 bgcolor=#E9E9E9
| 105307 ||  || — || August 26, 2000 || Socorro || LINEAR || HEN || align=right | 2.1 km || 
|-id=308 bgcolor=#d6d6d6
| 105308 ||  || — || August 28, 2000 || Socorro || LINEAR || LAU || align=right | 5.2 km || 
|-id=309 bgcolor=#E9E9E9
| 105309 ||  || — || August 28, 2000 || Socorro || LINEAR || GEF || align=right | 2.6 km || 
|-id=310 bgcolor=#d6d6d6
| 105310 ||  || — || August 28, 2000 || Socorro || LINEAR || TIR || align=right | 5.7 km || 
|-id=311 bgcolor=#fefefe
| 105311 ||  || — || August 28, 2000 || Socorro || LINEAR || H || align=right | 1.3 km || 
|-id=312 bgcolor=#d6d6d6
| 105312 ||  || — || August 30, 2000 || Needville || J. Dellinger, C. Gustava || — || align=right | 4.8 km || 
|-id=313 bgcolor=#E9E9E9
| 105313 ||  || — || August 24, 2000 || Socorro || LINEAR || AGN || align=right | 2.8 km || 
|-id=314 bgcolor=#E9E9E9
| 105314 ||  || — || August 24, 2000 || Socorro || LINEAR || AGN || align=right | 2.5 km || 
|-id=315 bgcolor=#E9E9E9
| 105315 ||  || — || August 24, 2000 || Socorro || LINEAR || — || align=right | 5.4 km || 
|-id=316 bgcolor=#fefefe
| 105316 ||  || — || August 24, 2000 || Socorro || LINEAR || — || align=right | 1.7 km || 
|-id=317 bgcolor=#d6d6d6
| 105317 ||  || — || August 24, 2000 || Socorro || LINEAR || — || align=right | 5.5 km || 
|-id=318 bgcolor=#d6d6d6
| 105318 ||  || — || August 24, 2000 || Socorro || LINEAR || — || align=right | 5.3 km || 
|-id=319 bgcolor=#fefefe
| 105319 ||  || — || August 24, 2000 || Socorro || LINEAR || — || align=right | 1.6 km || 
|-id=320 bgcolor=#E9E9E9
| 105320 ||  || — || August 24, 2000 || Socorro || LINEAR || WIT || align=right | 2.0 km || 
|-id=321 bgcolor=#E9E9E9
| 105321 ||  || — || August 24, 2000 || Socorro || LINEAR || — || align=right | 4.8 km || 
|-id=322 bgcolor=#E9E9E9
| 105322 ||  || — || August 24, 2000 || Socorro || LINEAR || XIZ || align=right | 3.4 km || 
|-id=323 bgcolor=#d6d6d6
| 105323 ||  || — || August 24, 2000 || Socorro || LINEAR || — || align=right | 5.1 km || 
|-id=324 bgcolor=#d6d6d6
| 105324 ||  || — || August 24, 2000 || Socorro || LINEAR || KAR || align=right | 3.1 km || 
|-id=325 bgcolor=#fefefe
| 105325 ||  || — || August 24, 2000 || Socorro || LINEAR || NYS || align=right | 1.3 km || 
|-id=326 bgcolor=#d6d6d6
| 105326 ||  || — || August 24, 2000 || Socorro || LINEAR || ALA || align=right | 7.3 km || 
|-id=327 bgcolor=#d6d6d6
| 105327 ||  || — || August 24, 2000 || Socorro || LINEAR || — || align=right | 6.5 km || 
|-id=328 bgcolor=#E9E9E9
| 105328 ||  || — || August 24, 2000 || Socorro || LINEAR || — || align=right | 2.0 km || 
|-id=329 bgcolor=#d6d6d6
| 105329 ||  || — || August 24, 2000 || Socorro || LINEAR || — || align=right | 5.7 km || 
|-id=330 bgcolor=#fefefe
| 105330 ||  || — || August 24, 2000 || Socorro || LINEAR || — || align=right | 1.4 km || 
|-id=331 bgcolor=#E9E9E9
| 105331 ||  || — || August 25, 2000 || Socorro || LINEAR || — || align=right | 2.9 km || 
|-id=332 bgcolor=#fefefe
| 105332 ||  || — || August 25, 2000 || Socorro || LINEAR || FLO || align=right | 1.5 km || 
|-id=333 bgcolor=#E9E9E9
| 105333 ||  || — || August 25, 2000 || Socorro || LINEAR || MRX || align=right | 2.7 km || 
|-id=334 bgcolor=#E9E9E9
| 105334 ||  || — || August 25, 2000 || Socorro || LINEAR || DOR || align=right | 6.3 km || 
|-id=335 bgcolor=#E9E9E9
| 105335 ||  || — || August 25, 2000 || Socorro || LINEAR || — || align=right | 4.2 km || 
|-id=336 bgcolor=#E9E9E9
| 105336 ||  || — || August 25, 2000 || Socorro || LINEAR || — || align=right | 6.6 km || 
|-id=337 bgcolor=#d6d6d6
| 105337 ||  || — || August 25, 2000 || Socorro || LINEAR || BRA || align=right | 2.6 km || 
|-id=338 bgcolor=#d6d6d6
| 105338 ||  || — || August 25, 2000 || Socorro || LINEAR || — || align=right | 7.0 km || 
|-id=339 bgcolor=#d6d6d6
| 105339 ||  || — || August 25, 2000 || Socorro || LINEAR || ALA || align=right | 12 km || 
|-id=340 bgcolor=#d6d6d6
| 105340 ||  || — || August 25, 2000 || Socorro || LINEAR || — || align=right | 6.8 km || 
|-id=341 bgcolor=#E9E9E9
| 105341 ||  || — || August 26, 2000 || Socorro || LINEAR || — || align=right | 6.2 km || 
|-id=342 bgcolor=#d6d6d6
| 105342 ||  || — || August 26, 2000 || Socorro || LINEAR || — || align=right | 6.1 km || 
|-id=343 bgcolor=#d6d6d6
| 105343 ||  || — || August 26, 2000 || Socorro || LINEAR || — || align=right | 6.2 km || 
|-id=344 bgcolor=#E9E9E9
| 105344 ||  || — || August 26, 2000 || Socorro || LINEAR || XIZ || align=right | 3.0 km || 
|-id=345 bgcolor=#fefefe
| 105345 ||  || — || August 26, 2000 || Socorro || LINEAR || — || align=right | 1.3 km || 
|-id=346 bgcolor=#d6d6d6
| 105346 ||  || — || August 28, 2000 || Socorro || LINEAR || — || align=right | 7.9 km || 
|-id=347 bgcolor=#d6d6d6
| 105347 ||  || — || August 28, 2000 || Socorro || LINEAR || — || align=right | 7.2 km || 
|-id=348 bgcolor=#fefefe
| 105348 ||  || — || August 28, 2000 || Socorro || LINEAR || FLO || align=right | 1.2 km || 
|-id=349 bgcolor=#fefefe
| 105349 ||  || — || August 28, 2000 || Socorro || LINEAR || NYS || align=right | 3.1 km || 
|-id=350 bgcolor=#d6d6d6
| 105350 ||  || — || August 28, 2000 || Socorro || LINEAR || CHA || align=right | 4.7 km || 
|-id=351 bgcolor=#d6d6d6
| 105351 ||  || — || August 28, 2000 || Socorro || LINEAR || — || align=right | 6.2 km || 
|-id=352 bgcolor=#d6d6d6
| 105352 ||  || — || August 28, 2000 || Socorro || LINEAR || HYG || align=right | 5.9 km || 
|-id=353 bgcolor=#d6d6d6
| 105353 ||  || — || August 28, 2000 || Socorro || LINEAR || — || align=right | 5.6 km || 
|-id=354 bgcolor=#d6d6d6
| 105354 ||  || — || August 29, 2000 || Socorro || LINEAR || — || align=right | 6.2 km || 
|-id=355 bgcolor=#fefefe
| 105355 ||  || — || August 29, 2000 || Socorro || LINEAR || — || align=right | 2.6 km || 
|-id=356 bgcolor=#d6d6d6
| 105356 ||  || — || August 29, 2000 || Socorro || LINEAR || 7:4 || align=right | 6.2 km || 
|-id=357 bgcolor=#fefefe
| 105357 ||  || — || August 29, 2000 || Socorro || LINEAR || FLO || align=right | 1.9 km || 
|-id=358 bgcolor=#d6d6d6
| 105358 ||  || — || August 24, 2000 || Socorro || LINEAR || — || align=right | 3.8 km || 
|-id=359 bgcolor=#d6d6d6
| 105359 ||  || — || August 24, 2000 || Socorro || LINEAR || EUP || align=right | 7.0 km || 
|-id=360 bgcolor=#d6d6d6
| 105360 ||  || — || August 24, 2000 || Socorro || LINEAR || — || align=right | 6.7 km || 
|-id=361 bgcolor=#d6d6d6
| 105361 ||  || — || August 24, 2000 || Socorro || LINEAR || — || align=right | 5.0 km || 
|-id=362 bgcolor=#E9E9E9
| 105362 ||  || — || August 24, 2000 || Socorro || LINEAR || MAR || align=right | 1.7 km || 
|-id=363 bgcolor=#fefefe
| 105363 ||  || — || August 25, 2000 || Socorro || LINEAR || V || align=right | 1.4 km || 
|-id=364 bgcolor=#fefefe
| 105364 ||  || — || August 28, 2000 || Socorro || LINEAR || — || align=right | 1.5 km || 
|-id=365 bgcolor=#d6d6d6
| 105365 ||  || — || August 25, 2000 || Socorro || LINEAR || TIR || align=right | 4.3 km || 
|-id=366 bgcolor=#E9E9E9
| 105366 ||  || — || August 25, 2000 || Socorro || LINEAR || — || align=right | 4.7 km || 
|-id=367 bgcolor=#d6d6d6
| 105367 ||  || — || August 25, 2000 || Socorro || LINEAR || — || align=right | 6.3 km || 
|-id=368 bgcolor=#fefefe
| 105368 ||  || — || August 26, 2000 || Socorro || LINEAR || V || align=right | 1.2 km || 
|-id=369 bgcolor=#d6d6d6
| 105369 ||  || — || August 31, 2000 || Socorro || LINEAR || — || align=right | 6.4 km || 
|-id=370 bgcolor=#E9E9E9
| 105370 ||  || — || August 31, 2000 || Socorro || LINEAR || INO || align=right | 2.1 km || 
|-id=371 bgcolor=#fefefe
| 105371 ||  || — || August 31, 2000 || Socorro || LINEAR || NYS || align=right | 1.2 km || 
|-id=372 bgcolor=#fefefe
| 105372 ||  || — || August 24, 2000 || Socorro || LINEAR || FLO || align=right | 1.4 km || 
|-id=373 bgcolor=#E9E9E9
| 105373 ||  || — || August 24, 2000 || Socorro || LINEAR || — || align=right | 6.4 km || 
|-id=374 bgcolor=#d6d6d6
| 105374 ||  || — || August 24, 2000 || Socorro || LINEAR || — || align=right | 4.3 km || 
|-id=375 bgcolor=#fefefe
| 105375 ||  || — || August 26, 2000 || Socorro || LINEAR || — || align=right | 1.4 km || 
|-id=376 bgcolor=#fefefe
| 105376 ||  || — || August 31, 2000 || Socorro || LINEAR || — || align=right | 1.7 km || 
|-id=377 bgcolor=#fefefe
| 105377 ||  || — || August 31, 2000 || Socorro || LINEAR || H || align=right | 1.5 km || 
|-id=378 bgcolor=#fefefe
| 105378 ||  || — || August 31, 2000 || Socorro || LINEAR || — || align=right | 2.6 km || 
|-id=379 bgcolor=#fefefe
| 105379 ||  || — || August 31, 2000 || Prescott || P. G. Comba || FLO || align=right | 1.1 km || 
|-id=380 bgcolor=#E9E9E9
| 105380 ||  || — || August 24, 2000 || Socorro || LINEAR || HOF || align=right | 6.3 km || 
|-id=381 bgcolor=#d6d6d6
| 105381 ||  || — || August 24, 2000 || Socorro || LINEAR || — || align=right | 7.3 km || 
|-id=382 bgcolor=#E9E9E9
| 105382 ||  || — || August 26, 2000 || Socorro || LINEAR || — || align=right | 7.2 km || 
|-id=383 bgcolor=#E9E9E9
| 105383 ||  || — || August 26, 2000 || Socorro || LINEAR || GER || align=right | 4.2 km || 
|-id=384 bgcolor=#fefefe
| 105384 ||  || — || August 29, 2000 || Socorro || LINEAR || NYS || align=right data-sort-value="0.83" | 830 m || 
|-id=385 bgcolor=#E9E9E9
| 105385 ||  || — || August 31, 2000 || Socorro || LINEAR || DOR || align=right | 4.9 km || 
|-id=386 bgcolor=#fefefe
| 105386 ||  || — || August 31, 2000 || Socorro || LINEAR || NYS || align=right | 1.6 km || 
|-id=387 bgcolor=#fefefe
| 105387 ||  || — || August 31, 2000 || Socorro || LINEAR || FLO || align=right | 1.3 km || 
|-id=388 bgcolor=#d6d6d6
| 105388 ||  || — || August 31, 2000 || Socorro || LINEAR || — || align=right | 9.2 km || 
|-id=389 bgcolor=#d6d6d6
| 105389 ||  || — || August 31, 2000 || Socorro || LINEAR || EOS || align=right | 4.0 km || 
|-id=390 bgcolor=#fefefe
| 105390 ||  || — || August 31, 2000 || Socorro || LINEAR || — || align=right | 1.7 km || 
|-id=391 bgcolor=#fefefe
| 105391 ||  || — || August 31, 2000 || Socorro || LINEAR || — || align=right | 3.5 km || 
|-id=392 bgcolor=#d6d6d6
| 105392 ||  || — || August 31, 2000 || Socorro || LINEAR || — || align=right | 5.1 km || 
|-id=393 bgcolor=#d6d6d6
| 105393 ||  || — || August 31, 2000 || Socorro || LINEAR || ALA || align=right | 7.3 km || 
|-id=394 bgcolor=#d6d6d6
| 105394 ||  || — || August 31, 2000 || Socorro || LINEAR || THM || align=right | 6.3 km || 
|-id=395 bgcolor=#d6d6d6
| 105395 ||  || — || August 31, 2000 || Socorro || LINEAR || THM || align=right | 5.2 km || 
|-id=396 bgcolor=#d6d6d6
| 105396 ||  || — || August 31, 2000 || Socorro || LINEAR || — || align=right | 6.7 km || 
|-id=397 bgcolor=#fefefe
| 105397 ||  || — || August 31, 2000 || Socorro || LINEAR || MAS || align=right | 1.3 km || 
|-id=398 bgcolor=#fefefe
| 105398 ||  || — || August 31, 2000 || Socorro || LINEAR || H || align=right | 1.8 km || 
|-id=399 bgcolor=#d6d6d6
| 105399 ||  || — || August 31, 2000 || Socorro || LINEAR || — || align=right | 4.8 km || 
|-id=400 bgcolor=#d6d6d6
| 105400 ||  || — || August 31, 2000 || Socorro || LINEAR || — || align=right | 6.3 km || 
|}

105401–105500 

|-bgcolor=#fefefe
| 105401 ||  || — || August 31, 2000 || Socorro || LINEAR || — || align=right | 3.6 km || 
|-id=402 bgcolor=#fefefe
| 105402 ||  || — || August 31, 2000 || Socorro || LINEAR || — || align=right | 1.6 km || 
|-id=403 bgcolor=#fefefe
| 105403 ||  || — || August 31, 2000 || Socorro || LINEAR || V || align=right | 1.4 km || 
|-id=404 bgcolor=#fefefe
| 105404 ||  || — || August 31, 2000 || Socorro || LINEAR || — || align=right | 1.3 km || 
|-id=405 bgcolor=#fefefe
| 105405 ||  || — || August 27, 2000 || Kvistaberg || UDAS || — || align=right | 1.3 km || 
|-id=406 bgcolor=#FA8072
| 105406 ||  || — || August 25, 2000 || Socorro || LINEAR || — || align=right | 1.5 km || 
|-id=407 bgcolor=#d6d6d6
| 105407 ||  || — || August 29, 2000 || Socorro || LINEAR || — || align=right | 9.4 km || 
|-id=408 bgcolor=#fefefe
| 105408 ||  || — || August 29, 2000 || Socorro || LINEAR || — || align=right | 1.7 km || 
|-id=409 bgcolor=#fefefe
| 105409 ||  || — || August 29, 2000 || Socorro || LINEAR || — || align=right | 1.4 km || 
|-id=410 bgcolor=#d6d6d6
| 105410 ||  || — || August 31, 2000 || Socorro || LINEAR || EOS || align=right | 3.7 km || 
|-id=411 bgcolor=#E9E9E9
| 105411 ||  || — || August 31, 2000 || Socorro || LINEAR || — || align=right | 5.2 km || 
|-id=412 bgcolor=#E9E9E9
| 105412 ||  || — || August 31, 2000 || Socorro || LINEAR || GEF || align=right | 3.2 km || 
|-id=413 bgcolor=#E9E9E9
| 105413 ||  || — || August 31, 2000 || Socorro || LINEAR || — || align=right | 5.2 km || 
|-id=414 bgcolor=#d6d6d6
| 105414 ||  || — || August 31, 2000 || Socorro || LINEAR || VER || align=right | 6.4 km || 
|-id=415 bgcolor=#E9E9E9
| 105415 ||  || — || August 31, 2000 || Socorro || LINEAR || — || align=right | 5.3 km || 
|-id=416 bgcolor=#d6d6d6
| 105416 ||  || — || August 31, 2000 || Socorro || LINEAR || TEL || align=right | 2.5 km || 
|-id=417 bgcolor=#fefefe
| 105417 ||  || — || August 31, 2000 || Socorro || LINEAR || — || align=right | 1.3 km || 
|-id=418 bgcolor=#d6d6d6
| 105418 ||  || — || August 31, 2000 || Socorro || LINEAR || EOS || align=right | 3.4 km || 
|-id=419 bgcolor=#E9E9E9
| 105419 ||  || — || August 31, 2000 || Socorro || LINEAR || CLO || align=right | 4.1 km || 
|-id=420 bgcolor=#E9E9E9
| 105420 ||  || — || August 31, 2000 || Socorro || LINEAR || HNA || align=right | 6.0 km || 
|-id=421 bgcolor=#d6d6d6
| 105421 ||  || — || August 31, 2000 || Socorro || LINEAR || — || align=right | 6.8 km || 
|-id=422 bgcolor=#E9E9E9
| 105422 ||  || — || August 31, 2000 || Socorro || LINEAR || DOR || align=right | 4.9 km || 
|-id=423 bgcolor=#d6d6d6
| 105423 ||  || — || August 31, 2000 || Socorro || LINEAR || NAE || align=right | 6.7 km || 
|-id=424 bgcolor=#d6d6d6
| 105424 ||  || — || August 31, 2000 || Socorro || LINEAR || — || align=right | 5.8 km || 
|-id=425 bgcolor=#fefefe
| 105425 ||  || — || August 31, 2000 || Socorro || LINEAR || FLO || align=right | 1.5 km || 
|-id=426 bgcolor=#fefefe
| 105426 ||  || — || August 31, 2000 || Socorro || LINEAR || — || align=right | 1.7 km || 
|-id=427 bgcolor=#E9E9E9
| 105427 ||  || — || August 31, 2000 || Socorro || LINEAR || — || align=right | 8.3 km || 
|-id=428 bgcolor=#d6d6d6
| 105428 ||  || — || August 31, 2000 || Socorro || LINEAR || — || align=right | 6.8 km || 
|-id=429 bgcolor=#d6d6d6
| 105429 ||  || — || August 31, 2000 || Socorro || LINEAR || — || align=right | 5.6 km || 
|-id=430 bgcolor=#d6d6d6
| 105430 ||  || — || August 31, 2000 || Socorro || LINEAR || — || align=right | 6.4 km || 
|-id=431 bgcolor=#fefefe
| 105431 ||  || — || August 31, 2000 || Socorro || LINEAR || ERI || align=right | 3.6 km || 
|-id=432 bgcolor=#E9E9E9
| 105432 ||  || — || August 31, 2000 || Socorro || LINEAR || GEF || align=right | 2.6 km || 
|-id=433 bgcolor=#d6d6d6
| 105433 ||  || — || August 31, 2000 || Socorro || LINEAR || CRO || align=right | 6.3 km || 
|-id=434 bgcolor=#E9E9E9
| 105434 ||  || — || August 31, 2000 || Socorro || LINEAR || MRX || align=right | 2.8 km || 
|-id=435 bgcolor=#d6d6d6
| 105435 ||  || — || August 31, 2000 || Socorro || LINEAR || — || align=right | 11 km || 
|-id=436 bgcolor=#E9E9E9
| 105436 ||  || — || August 31, 2000 || Socorro || LINEAR || AGN || align=right | 2.1 km || 
|-id=437 bgcolor=#d6d6d6
| 105437 ||  || — || August 31, 2000 || Socorro || LINEAR || EOS || align=right | 3.1 km || 
|-id=438 bgcolor=#E9E9E9
| 105438 ||  || — || August 31, 2000 || Socorro || LINEAR || — || align=right | 4.8 km || 
|-id=439 bgcolor=#d6d6d6
| 105439 ||  || — || August 31, 2000 || Socorro || LINEAR || KOR || align=right | 2.9 km || 
|-id=440 bgcolor=#fefefe
| 105440 ||  || — || August 31, 2000 || Socorro || LINEAR || H || align=right | 1.5 km || 
|-id=441 bgcolor=#fefefe
| 105441 ||  || — || August 31, 2000 || Socorro || LINEAR || — || align=right | 2.4 km || 
|-id=442 bgcolor=#E9E9E9
| 105442 ||  || — || August 31, 2000 || Socorro || LINEAR || — || align=right | 2.8 km || 
|-id=443 bgcolor=#fefefe
| 105443 ||  || — || August 31, 2000 || Socorro || LINEAR || — || align=right | 2.1 km || 
|-id=444 bgcolor=#d6d6d6
| 105444 ||  || — || August 31, 2000 || Socorro || LINEAR || TIR || align=right | 4.1 km || 
|-id=445 bgcolor=#fefefe
| 105445 ||  || — || August 24, 2000 || Socorro || LINEAR || H || align=right | 2.3 km || 
|-id=446 bgcolor=#E9E9E9
| 105446 ||  || — || August 26, 2000 || Socorro || LINEAR || — || align=right | 4.7 km || 
|-id=447 bgcolor=#E9E9E9
| 105447 ||  || — || August 26, 2000 || Socorro || LINEAR || — || align=right | 5.8 km || 
|-id=448 bgcolor=#E9E9E9
| 105448 ||  || — || August 26, 2000 || Socorro || LINEAR || MAR || align=right | 1.9 km || 
|-id=449 bgcolor=#E9E9E9
| 105449 ||  || — || August 26, 2000 || Socorro || LINEAR || EUN || align=right | 2.0 km || 
|-id=450 bgcolor=#E9E9E9
| 105450 ||  || — || August 26, 2000 || Socorro || LINEAR || — || align=right | 4.8 km || 
|-id=451 bgcolor=#E9E9E9
| 105451 ||  || — || August 28, 2000 || Socorro || LINEAR || — || align=right | 5.8 km || 
|-id=452 bgcolor=#E9E9E9
| 105452 ||  || — || August 29, 2000 || Socorro || LINEAR || — || align=right | 4.2 km || 
|-id=453 bgcolor=#E9E9E9
| 105453 ||  || — || August 26, 2000 || Socorro || LINEAR || — || align=right | 4.4 km || 
|-id=454 bgcolor=#E9E9E9
| 105454 ||  || — || August 26, 2000 || Socorro || LINEAR || GEF || align=right | 2.8 km || 
|-id=455 bgcolor=#fefefe
| 105455 ||  || — || August 29, 2000 || Socorro || LINEAR || MAS || align=right | 1.2 km || 
|-id=456 bgcolor=#fefefe
| 105456 ||  || — || August 29, 2000 || Socorro || LINEAR || NYS || align=right | 3.1 km || 
|-id=457 bgcolor=#d6d6d6
| 105457 ||  || — || August 29, 2000 || Socorro || LINEAR || EOS || align=right | 3.5 km || 
|-id=458 bgcolor=#d6d6d6
| 105458 ||  || — || August 29, 2000 || Socorro || LINEAR || — || align=right | 7.1 km || 
|-id=459 bgcolor=#fefefe
| 105459 ||  || — || August 29, 2000 || Socorro || LINEAR || — || align=right | 1.4 km || 
|-id=460 bgcolor=#fefefe
| 105460 ||  || — || August 29, 2000 || Socorro || LINEAR || V || align=right | 1.2 km || 
|-id=461 bgcolor=#d6d6d6
| 105461 ||  || — || August 31, 2000 || Socorro || LINEAR || — || align=right | 5.7 km || 
|-id=462 bgcolor=#d6d6d6
| 105462 ||  || — || August 31, 2000 || Socorro || LINEAR || — || align=right | 4.0 km || 
|-id=463 bgcolor=#d6d6d6
| 105463 ||  || — || August 31, 2000 || Socorro || LINEAR || EOS || align=right | 3.9 km || 
|-id=464 bgcolor=#fefefe
| 105464 ||  || — || August 31, 2000 || Socorro || LINEAR || MAS || align=right | 1.6 km || 
|-id=465 bgcolor=#d6d6d6
| 105465 ||  || — || August 31, 2000 || Socorro || LINEAR || — || align=right | 6.0 km || 
|-id=466 bgcolor=#d6d6d6
| 105466 ||  || — || August 31, 2000 || Socorro || LINEAR || — || align=right | 5.5 km || 
|-id=467 bgcolor=#d6d6d6
| 105467 ||  || — || August 31, 2000 || Socorro || LINEAR || — || align=right | 7.0 km || 
|-id=468 bgcolor=#fefefe
| 105468 ||  || — || August 31, 2000 || Socorro || LINEAR || — || align=right | 2.0 km || 
|-id=469 bgcolor=#fefefe
| 105469 ||  || — || August 31, 2000 || Socorro || LINEAR || FLO || align=right data-sort-value="0.96" | 960 m || 
|-id=470 bgcolor=#fefefe
| 105470 ||  || — || August 31, 2000 || Socorro || LINEAR || — || align=right | 2.3 km || 
|-id=471 bgcolor=#E9E9E9
| 105471 ||  || — || August 31, 2000 || Socorro || LINEAR || — || align=right | 3.9 km || 
|-id=472 bgcolor=#E9E9E9
| 105472 ||  || — || August 31, 2000 || Socorro || LINEAR || — || align=right | 4.8 km || 
|-id=473 bgcolor=#d6d6d6
| 105473 ||  || — || August 31, 2000 || Socorro || LINEAR || THM || align=right | 4.2 km || 
|-id=474 bgcolor=#d6d6d6
| 105474 ||  || — || August 31, 2000 || Socorro || LINEAR || — || align=right | 5.3 km || 
|-id=475 bgcolor=#fefefe
| 105475 ||  || — || August 31, 2000 || Socorro || LINEAR || — || align=right | 1.3 km || 
|-id=476 bgcolor=#d6d6d6
| 105476 ||  || — || August 31, 2000 || Socorro || LINEAR || KOR || align=right | 2.9 km || 
|-id=477 bgcolor=#fefefe
| 105477 ||  || — || August 31, 2000 || Socorro || LINEAR || — || align=right | 1.5 km || 
|-id=478 bgcolor=#fefefe
| 105478 ||  || — || August 31, 2000 || Socorro || LINEAR || MAS || align=right | 1.5 km || 
|-id=479 bgcolor=#fefefe
| 105479 ||  || — || August 31, 2000 || Socorro || LINEAR || — || align=right | 1.4 km || 
|-id=480 bgcolor=#fefefe
| 105480 ||  || — || August 31, 2000 || Socorro || LINEAR || — || align=right | 1.7 km || 
|-id=481 bgcolor=#d6d6d6
| 105481 ||  || — || August 31, 2000 || Socorro || LINEAR || — || align=right | 7.2 km || 
|-id=482 bgcolor=#E9E9E9
| 105482 ||  || — || August 31, 2000 || Socorro || LINEAR || MIS || align=right | 4.0 km || 
|-id=483 bgcolor=#E9E9E9
| 105483 ||  || — || August 31, 2000 || Socorro || LINEAR || — || align=right | 1.4 km || 
|-id=484 bgcolor=#d6d6d6
| 105484 ||  || — || August 31, 2000 || Socorro || LINEAR || — || align=right | 4.9 km || 
|-id=485 bgcolor=#fefefe
| 105485 ||  || — || August 31, 2000 || Socorro || LINEAR || — || align=right | 1.7 km || 
|-id=486 bgcolor=#d6d6d6
| 105486 ||  || — || August 31, 2000 || Socorro || LINEAR || — || align=right | 4.5 km || 
|-id=487 bgcolor=#E9E9E9
| 105487 ||  || — || August 20, 2000 || Anderson Mesa || LONEOS || HNA || align=right | 6.9 km || 
|-id=488 bgcolor=#d6d6d6
| 105488 ||  || — || August 21, 2000 || Anderson Mesa || LONEOS || — || align=right | 4.7 km || 
|-id=489 bgcolor=#d6d6d6
| 105489 ||  || — || August 21, 2000 || Anderson Mesa || LONEOS || 628 || align=right | 2.8 km || 
|-id=490 bgcolor=#E9E9E9
| 105490 ||  || — || August 24, 2000 || Socorro || LINEAR || — || align=right | 4.7 km || 
|-id=491 bgcolor=#E9E9E9
| 105491 ||  || — || August 31, 2000 || Socorro || LINEAR || — || align=right | 4.7 km || 
|-id=492 bgcolor=#d6d6d6
| 105492 ||  || — || August 31, 2000 || Socorro || LINEAR || — || align=right | 6.3 km || 
|-id=493 bgcolor=#d6d6d6
| 105493 ||  || — || August 31, 2000 || Socorro || LINEAR || KOR || align=right | 2.6 km || 
|-id=494 bgcolor=#d6d6d6
| 105494 ||  || — || August 31, 2000 || Socorro || LINEAR || — || align=right | 4.9 km || 
|-id=495 bgcolor=#d6d6d6
| 105495 ||  || — || August 31, 2000 || Socorro || LINEAR || — || align=right | 5.9 km || 
|-id=496 bgcolor=#d6d6d6
| 105496 ||  || — || August 31, 2000 || Socorro || LINEAR || — || align=right | 4.4 km || 
|-id=497 bgcolor=#d6d6d6
| 105497 ||  || — || August 31, 2000 || Socorro || LINEAR || EOS || align=right | 3.9 km || 
|-id=498 bgcolor=#d6d6d6
| 105498 ||  || — || August 31, 2000 || Socorro || LINEAR || — || align=right | 7.4 km || 
|-id=499 bgcolor=#d6d6d6
| 105499 ||  || — || August 31, 2000 || Socorro || LINEAR || — || align=right | 4.7 km || 
|-id=500 bgcolor=#fefefe
| 105500 ||  || — || August 29, 2000 || Socorro || LINEAR || NYS || align=right | 2.3 km || 
|}

105501–105600 

|-bgcolor=#d6d6d6
| 105501 ||  || — || August 29, 2000 || Socorro || LINEAR || — || align=right | 4.2 km || 
|-id=502 bgcolor=#d6d6d6
| 105502 ||  || — || August 20, 2000 || Anderson Mesa || LONEOS || EOS || align=right | 4.1 km || 
|-id=503 bgcolor=#fefefe
| 105503 ||  || — || September 1, 2000 || Socorro || LINEAR || NYS || align=right | 1.2 km || 
|-id=504 bgcolor=#d6d6d6
| 105504 ||  || — || September 1, 2000 || Socorro || LINEAR || EUP || align=right | 12 km || 
|-id=505 bgcolor=#d6d6d6
| 105505 ||  || — || September 1, 2000 || Socorro || LINEAR || — || align=right | 5.9 km || 
|-id=506 bgcolor=#d6d6d6
| 105506 ||  || — || September 1, 2000 || Socorro || LINEAR || — || align=right | 3.1 km || 
|-id=507 bgcolor=#d6d6d6
| 105507 ||  || — || September 1, 2000 || Socorro || LINEAR || — || align=right | 6.1 km || 
|-id=508 bgcolor=#d6d6d6
| 105508 ||  || — || September 3, 2000 || Emerald Lane || L. Ball || — || align=right | 5.4 km || 
|-id=509 bgcolor=#fefefe
| 105509 ||  || — || September 1, 2000 || Socorro || LINEAR || — || align=right | 4.2 km || 
|-id=510 bgcolor=#d6d6d6
| 105510 ||  || — || September 1, 2000 || Socorro || LINEAR || — || align=right | 6.6 km || 
|-id=511 bgcolor=#d6d6d6
| 105511 ||  || — || September 1, 2000 || Socorro || LINEAR || — || align=right | 8.2 km || 
|-id=512 bgcolor=#d6d6d6
| 105512 ||  || — || September 1, 2000 || Socorro || LINEAR || EOS || align=right | 4.2 km || 
|-id=513 bgcolor=#d6d6d6
| 105513 ||  || — || September 1, 2000 || Socorro || LINEAR || — || align=right | 6.2 km || 
|-id=514 bgcolor=#d6d6d6
| 105514 ||  || — || September 1, 2000 || Socorro || LINEAR || EOS || align=right | 3.4 km || 
|-id=515 bgcolor=#d6d6d6
| 105515 ||  || — || September 1, 2000 || Socorro || LINEAR || — || align=right | 5.6 km || 
|-id=516 bgcolor=#E9E9E9
| 105516 ||  || — || September 1, 2000 || Socorro || LINEAR || — || align=right | 6.2 km || 
|-id=517 bgcolor=#d6d6d6
| 105517 ||  || — || September 1, 2000 || Socorro || LINEAR || — || align=right | 6.8 km || 
|-id=518 bgcolor=#d6d6d6
| 105518 ||  || — || September 1, 2000 || Socorro || LINEAR || — || align=right | 7.2 km || 
|-id=519 bgcolor=#d6d6d6
| 105519 ||  || — || September 1, 2000 || Socorro || LINEAR || — || align=right | 4.2 km || 
|-id=520 bgcolor=#d6d6d6
| 105520 ||  || — || September 1, 2000 || Socorro || LINEAR || HYG || align=right | 5.7 km || 
|-id=521 bgcolor=#d6d6d6
| 105521 ||  || — || September 1, 2000 || Socorro || LINEAR || — || align=right | 10 km || 
|-id=522 bgcolor=#d6d6d6
| 105522 ||  || — || September 1, 2000 || Socorro || LINEAR || EUP || align=right | 7.8 km || 
|-id=523 bgcolor=#fefefe
| 105523 ||  || — || September 1, 2000 || Socorro || LINEAR || FLO || align=right | 1.2 km || 
|-id=524 bgcolor=#d6d6d6
| 105524 ||  || — || September 1, 2000 || Socorro || LINEAR || — || align=right | 3.0 km || 
|-id=525 bgcolor=#d6d6d6
| 105525 ||  || — || September 1, 2000 || Socorro || LINEAR || — || align=right | 3.6 km || 
|-id=526 bgcolor=#E9E9E9
| 105526 ||  || — || September 1, 2000 || Socorro || LINEAR || — || align=right | 5.5 km || 
|-id=527 bgcolor=#d6d6d6
| 105527 ||  || — || September 1, 2000 || Socorro || LINEAR || EOS || align=right | 3.3 km || 
|-id=528 bgcolor=#fefefe
| 105528 ||  || — || September 1, 2000 || Socorro || LINEAR || V || align=right | 1.3 km || 
|-id=529 bgcolor=#d6d6d6
| 105529 ||  || — || September 1, 2000 || Socorro || LINEAR || — || align=right | 4.5 km || 
|-id=530 bgcolor=#d6d6d6
| 105530 ||  || — || September 1, 2000 || Socorro || LINEAR || EOS || align=right | 3.6 km || 
|-id=531 bgcolor=#d6d6d6
| 105531 ||  || — || September 1, 2000 || Socorro || LINEAR || — || align=right | 6.7 km || 
|-id=532 bgcolor=#d6d6d6
| 105532 ||  || — || September 1, 2000 || Socorro || LINEAR || EOS || align=right | 3.7 km || 
|-id=533 bgcolor=#d6d6d6
| 105533 ||  || — || September 1, 2000 || Socorro || LINEAR || — || align=right | 3.7 km || 
|-id=534 bgcolor=#d6d6d6
| 105534 ||  || — || September 1, 2000 || Socorro || LINEAR || — || align=right | 3.3 km || 
|-id=535 bgcolor=#d6d6d6
| 105535 ||  || — || September 1, 2000 || Socorro || LINEAR || — || align=right | 8.0 km || 
|-id=536 bgcolor=#fefefe
| 105536 ||  || — || September 3, 2000 || Socorro || LINEAR || H || align=right | 1.4 km || 
|-id=537 bgcolor=#fefefe
| 105537 ||  || — || September 3, 2000 || Socorro || LINEAR || H || align=right | 1.4 km || 
|-id=538 bgcolor=#d6d6d6
| 105538 ||  || — || September 5, 2000 || Farpoint || G. Hug || — || align=right | 9.0 km || 
|-id=539 bgcolor=#d6d6d6
| 105539 ||  || — || September 1, 2000 || Socorro || LINEAR || TIR || align=right | 6.6 km || 
|-id=540 bgcolor=#E9E9E9
| 105540 ||  || — || September 3, 2000 || Socorro || LINEAR || — || align=right | 7.1 km || 
|-id=541 bgcolor=#d6d6d6
| 105541 ||  || — || September 3, 2000 || Socorro || LINEAR || — || align=right | 7.0 km || 
|-id=542 bgcolor=#d6d6d6
| 105542 ||  || — || September 3, 2000 || Socorro || LINEAR || EOS || align=right | 4.5 km || 
|-id=543 bgcolor=#d6d6d6
| 105543 ||  || — || September 3, 2000 || Socorro || LINEAR || — || align=right | 4.3 km || 
|-id=544 bgcolor=#fefefe
| 105544 ||  || — || September 3, 2000 || Socorro || LINEAR || — || align=right | 2.0 km || 
|-id=545 bgcolor=#d6d6d6
| 105545 ||  || — || September 3, 2000 || Socorro || LINEAR || EOS || align=right | 3.6 km || 
|-id=546 bgcolor=#fefefe
| 105546 ||  || — || September 3, 2000 || Socorro || LINEAR || H || align=right | 1.4 km || 
|-id=547 bgcolor=#d6d6d6
| 105547 ||  || — || September 3, 2000 || Socorro || LINEAR || — || align=right | 6.6 km || 
|-id=548 bgcolor=#d6d6d6
| 105548 ||  || — || September 3, 2000 || Socorro || LINEAR || — || align=right | 9.0 km || 
|-id=549 bgcolor=#d6d6d6
| 105549 ||  || — || September 3, 2000 || Socorro || LINEAR || BRA || align=right | 3.6 km || 
|-id=550 bgcolor=#d6d6d6
| 105550 ||  || — || September 3, 2000 || Socorro || LINEAR || — || align=right | 4.4 km || 
|-id=551 bgcolor=#fefefe
| 105551 ||  || — || September 3, 2000 || Socorro || LINEAR || — || align=right | 2.4 km || 
|-id=552 bgcolor=#d6d6d6
| 105552 ||  || — || September 5, 2000 || Socorro || LINEAR || EUP || align=right | 8.1 km || 
|-id=553 bgcolor=#d6d6d6
| 105553 ||  || — || September 5, 2000 || Socorro || LINEAR || — || align=right | 15 km || 
|-id=554 bgcolor=#d6d6d6
| 105554 ||  || — || September 5, 2000 || Višnjan Observatory || K. Korlević || — || align=right | 7.7 km || 
|-id=555 bgcolor=#d6d6d6
| 105555 ||  || — || September 5, 2000 || Višnjan Observatory || K. Korlević || — || align=right | 4.5 km || 
|-id=556 bgcolor=#fefefe
| 105556 ||  || — || September 3, 2000 || Socorro || LINEAR || H || align=right data-sort-value="0.92" | 920 m || 
|-id=557 bgcolor=#d6d6d6
| 105557 ||  || — || September 1, 2000 || Socorro || LINEAR || — || align=right | 6.7 km || 
|-id=558 bgcolor=#d6d6d6
| 105558 ||  || — || September 3, 2000 || Socorro || LINEAR || EOS || align=right | 4.7 km || 
|-id=559 bgcolor=#d6d6d6
| 105559 ||  || — || September 3, 2000 || Socorro || LINEAR || — || align=right | 7.3 km || 
|-id=560 bgcolor=#d6d6d6
| 105560 ||  || — || September 5, 2000 || Socorro || LINEAR || KOR || align=right | 2.8 km || 
|-id=561 bgcolor=#d6d6d6
| 105561 ||  || — || September 5, 2000 || Socorro || LINEAR || — || align=right | 6.0 km || 
|-id=562 bgcolor=#fefefe
| 105562 ||  || — || September 7, 2000 || Kitt Peak || Spacewatch || — || align=right | 1.8 km || 
|-id=563 bgcolor=#fefefe
| 105563 ||  || — || September 7, 2000 || Kitt Peak || Spacewatch || — || align=right data-sort-value="0.99" | 990 m || 
|-id=564 bgcolor=#d6d6d6
| 105564 ||  || — || September 3, 2000 || Socorro || LINEAR || — || align=right | 11 km || 
|-id=565 bgcolor=#d6d6d6
| 105565 ||  || — || September 1, 2000 || Socorro || LINEAR || — || align=right | 5.4 km || 
|-id=566 bgcolor=#d6d6d6
| 105566 ||  || — || September 3, 2000 || Socorro || LINEAR || — || align=right | 5.6 km || 
|-id=567 bgcolor=#d6d6d6
| 105567 ||  || — || September 1, 2000 || Socorro || LINEAR || — || align=right | 7.7 km || 
|-id=568 bgcolor=#d6d6d6
| 105568 ||  || — || September 1, 2000 || Socorro || LINEAR || KOR || align=right | 3.1 km || 
|-id=569 bgcolor=#d6d6d6
| 105569 ||  || — || September 1, 2000 || Socorro || LINEAR || BRA || align=right | 2.7 km || 
|-id=570 bgcolor=#fefefe
| 105570 ||  || — || September 1, 2000 || Socorro || LINEAR || — || align=right | 1.8 km || 
|-id=571 bgcolor=#fefefe
| 105571 ||  || — || September 1, 2000 || Socorro || LINEAR || FLO || align=right | 1.5 km || 
|-id=572 bgcolor=#fefefe
| 105572 ||  || — || September 2, 2000 || Socorro || LINEAR || — || align=right | 3.4 km || 
|-id=573 bgcolor=#d6d6d6
| 105573 ||  || — || September 2, 2000 || Socorro || LINEAR || — || align=right | 8.3 km || 
|-id=574 bgcolor=#d6d6d6
| 105574 ||  || — || September 2, 2000 || Socorro || LINEAR || — || align=right | 5.5 km || 
|-id=575 bgcolor=#fefefe
| 105575 ||  || — || September 2, 2000 || Socorro || LINEAR || FLO || align=right | 2.1 km || 
|-id=576 bgcolor=#d6d6d6
| 105576 ||  || — || September 2, 2000 || Socorro || LINEAR || — || align=right | 5.3 km || 
|-id=577 bgcolor=#d6d6d6
| 105577 ||  || — || September 3, 2000 || Socorro || LINEAR || SYL7:4 || align=right | 7.6 km || 
|-id=578 bgcolor=#fefefe
| 105578 ||  || — || September 3, 2000 || Socorro || LINEAR || — || align=right | 1.5 km || 
|-id=579 bgcolor=#fefefe
| 105579 ||  || — || September 8, 2000 || Višnjan Observatory || K. Korlević || — || align=right | 1.4 km || 
|-id=580 bgcolor=#d6d6d6
| 105580 ||  || — || September 8, 2000 || Kitt Peak || Spacewatch || EOS || align=right | 3.0 km || 
|-id=581 bgcolor=#d6d6d6
| 105581 ||  || — || September 1, 2000 || Socorro || LINEAR || — || align=right | 4.5 km || 
|-id=582 bgcolor=#E9E9E9
| 105582 ||  || — || September 1, 2000 || Socorro || LINEAR || INO || align=right | 2.5 km || 
|-id=583 bgcolor=#d6d6d6
| 105583 ||  || — || September 1, 2000 || Socorro || LINEAR || — || align=right | 11 km || 
|-id=584 bgcolor=#d6d6d6
| 105584 ||  || — || September 1, 2000 || Socorro || LINEAR || EOS || align=right | 4.0 km || 
|-id=585 bgcolor=#d6d6d6
| 105585 ||  || — || September 1, 2000 || Socorro || LINEAR || — || align=right | 7.5 km || 
|-id=586 bgcolor=#d6d6d6
| 105586 ||  || — || September 2, 2000 || Anderson Mesa || LONEOS || THM || align=right | 8.7 km || 
|-id=587 bgcolor=#E9E9E9
| 105587 ||  || — || September 2, 2000 || Anderson Mesa || LONEOS || NEM || align=right | 5.9 km || 
|-id=588 bgcolor=#d6d6d6
| 105588 ||  || — || September 2, 2000 || Socorro || LINEAR || — || align=right | 5.8 km || 
|-id=589 bgcolor=#E9E9E9
| 105589 ||  || — || September 2, 2000 || Socorro || LINEAR || — || align=right | 2.8 km || 
|-id=590 bgcolor=#d6d6d6
| 105590 ||  || — || September 2, 2000 || Socorro || LINEAR || EOS || align=right | 3.9 km || 
|-id=591 bgcolor=#d6d6d6
| 105591 ||  || — || September 2, 2000 || Anderson Mesa || LONEOS || — || align=right | 4.2 km || 
|-id=592 bgcolor=#d6d6d6
| 105592 ||  || — || September 3, 2000 || Socorro || LINEAR || NAE || align=right | 4.3 km || 
|-id=593 bgcolor=#d6d6d6
| 105593 ||  || — || September 3, 2000 || Socorro || LINEAR || — || align=right | 6.3 km || 
|-id=594 bgcolor=#d6d6d6
| 105594 ||  || — || September 3, 2000 || Socorro || LINEAR || EOS || align=right | 4.0 km || 
|-id=595 bgcolor=#fefefe
| 105595 ||  || — || September 3, 2000 || Socorro || LINEAR || V || align=right | 1.4 km || 
|-id=596 bgcolor=#E9E9E9
| 105596 ||  || — || September 3, 2000 || Socorro || LINEAR || GEF || align=right | 3.1 km || 
|-id=597 bgcolor=#d6d6d6
| 105597 ||  || — || September 3, 2000 || Socorro || LINEAR || — || align=right | 6.1 km || 
|-id=598 bgcolor=#d6d6d6
| 105598 ||  || — || September 3, 2000 || Socorro || LINEAR || — || align=right | 9.9 km || 
|-id=599 bgcolor=#fefefe
| 105599 ||  || — || September 3, 2000 || Socorro || LINEAR || FLO || align=right | 1.3 km || 
|-id=600 bgcolor=#fefefe
| 105600 ||  || — || September 3, 2000 || Socorro || LINEAR || — || align=right | 1.6 km || 
|}

105601–105700 

|-bgcolor=#d6d6d6
| 105601 ||  || — || September 3, 2000 || Socorro || LINEAR || — || align=right | 5.2 km || 
|-id=602 bgcolor=#E9E9E9
| 105602 ||  || — || September 4, 2000 || Anderson Mesa || LONEOS || HNS || align=right | 2.8 km || 
|-id=603 bgcolor=#E9E9E9
| 105603 ||  || — || September 4, 2000 || Anderson Mesa || LONEOS || — || align=right | 4.1 km || 
|-id=604 bgcolor=#d6d6d6
| 105604 ||  || — || September 4, 2000 || Anderson Mesa || LONEOS || — || align=right | 6.9 km || 
|-id=605 bgcolor=#fefefe
| 105605 ||  || — || September 4, 2000 || Anderson Mesa || LONEOS || — || align=right | 1.4 km || 
|-id=606 bgcolor=#d6d6d6
| 105606 ||  || — || September 4, 2000 || Anderson Mesa || LONEOS || — || align=right | 5.0 km || 
|-id=607 bgcolor=#fefefe
| 105607 ||  || — || September 4, 2000 || Anderson Mesa || LONEOS || — || align=right | 1.0 km || 
|-id=608 bgcolor=#E9E9E9
| 105608 ||  || — || September 5, 2000 || Anderson Mesa || LONEOS || — || align=right | 6.1 km || 
|-id=609 bgcolor=#d6d6d6
| 105609 ||  || — || September 5, 2000 || Anderson Mesa || LONEOS || — || align=right | 3.6 km || 
|-id=610 bgcolor=#d6d6d6
| 105610 ||  || — || September 5, 2000 || Anderson Mesa || LONEOS || — || align=right | 5.4 km || 
|-id=611 bgcolor=#E9E9E9
| 105611 ||  || — || September 5, 2000 || Anderson Mesa || LONEOS || — || align=right | 6.2 km || 
|-id=612 bgcolor=#d6d6d6
| 105612 ||  || — || September 5, 2000 || Anderson Mesa || LONEOS || EOS || align=right | 5.5 km || 
|-id=613 bgcolor=#fefefe
| 105613 Odedaharonson ||  ||  || September 5, 2000 || Anderson Mesa || LONEOS || H || align=right | 1.3 km || 
|-id=614 bgcolor=#d6d6d6
| 105614 ||  || — || September 5, 2000 || Anderson Mesa || LONEOS || — || align=right | 7.7 km || 
|-id=615 bgcolor=#d6d6d6
| 105615 ||  || — || September 5, 2000 || Anderson Mesa || LONEOS || NAE || align=right | 6.7 km || 
|-id=616 bgcolor=#d6d6d6
| 105616 ||  || — || September 5, 2000 || Anderson Mesa || LONEOS || LIX || align=right | 9.2 km || 
|-id=617 bgcolor=#d6d6d6
| 105617 ||  || — || September 5, 2000 || Anderson Mesa || LONEOS || — || align=right | 6.3 km || 
|-id=618 bgcolor=#d6d6d6
| 105618 ||  || — || September 5, 2000 || Anderson Mesa || LONEOS || — || align=right | 8.8 km || 
|-id=619 bgcolor=#d6d6d6
| 105619 ||  || — || September 6, 2000 || Socorro || LINEAR || — || align=right | 5.9 km || 
|-id=620 bgcolor=#d6d6d6
| 105620 ||  || — || September 6, 2000 || Socorro || LINEAR || — || align=right | 4.7 km || 
|-id=621 bgcolor=#fefefe
| 105621 ||  || — || September 7, 2000 || Socorro || LINEAR || H || align=right | 1.9 km || 
|-id=622 bgcolor=#d6d6d6
| 105622 ||  || — || September 7, 2000 || Socorro || LINEAR || — || align=right | 3.9 km || 
|-id=623 bgcolor=#fefefe
| 105623 ||  || — || September 18, 2000 || Socorro || LINEAR || H || align=right | 2.0 km || 
|-id=624 bgcolor=#E9E9E9
| 105624 ||  || — || September 20, 2000 || Socorro || LINEAR || — || align=right | 4.1 km || 
|-id=625 bgcolor=#fefefe
| 105625 ||  || — || September 21, 2000 || Haleakala || NEAT || — || align=right | 1.2 km || 
|-id=626 bgcolor=#fefefe
| 105626 ||  || — || September 20, 2000 || Socorro || LINEAR || H || align=right | 1.2 km || 
|-id=627 bgcolor=#d6d6d6
| 105627 ||  || — || September 20, 2000 || Socorro || LINEAR || Tj (2.95) || align=right | 9.0 km || 
|-id=628 bgcolor=#FA8072
| 105628 ||  || — || September 22, 2000 || Socorro || LINEAR || H || align=right | 1.3 km || 
|-id=629 bgcolor=#d6d6d6
| 105629 ||  || — || September 22, 2000 || Socorro || LINEAR || — || align=right | 5.1 km || 
|-id=630 bgcolor=#d6d6d6
| 105630 ||  || — || September 20, 2000 || Socorro || LINEAR || ALA || align=right | 9.4 km || 
|-id=631 bgcolor=#fefefe
| 105631 ||  || — || September 22, 2000 || Kitt Peak || Spacewatch || FLO || align=right | 1.1 km || 
|-id=632 bgcolor=#E9E9E9
| 105632 ||  || — || September 22, 2000 || Prescott || P. G. Comba || MRX || align=right | 1.7 km || 
|-id=633 bgcolor=#fefefe
| 105633 ||  || — || September 23, 2000 || Socorro || LINEAR || H || align=right | 1.3 km || 
|-id=634 bgcolor=#d6d6d6
| 105634 ||  || — || September 21, 2000 || Socorro || LINEAR || — || align=right | 2.8 km || 
|-id=635 bgcolor=#fefefe
| 105635 ||  || — || September 21, 2000 || Socorro || LINEAR || V || align=right | 1.3 km || 
|-id=636 bgcolor=#d6d6d6
| 105636 ||  || — || September 21, 2000 || Socorro || LINEAR || — || align=right | 6.1 km || 
|-id=637 bgcolor=#fefefe
| 105637 ||  || — || September 23, 2000 || Socorro || LINEAR || ERI || align=right | 3.3 km || 
|-id=638 bgcolor=#d6d6d6
| 105638 ||  || — || September 23, 2000 || Socorro || LINEAR || — || align=right | 6.8 km || 
|-id=639 bgcolor=#d6d6d6
| 105639 ||  || — || September 23, 2000 || Socorro || LINEAR || — || align=right | 3.9 km || 
|-id=640 bgcolor=#fefefe
| 105640 ||  || — || September 23, 2000 || Socorro || LINEAR || FLO || align=right | 1.3 km || 
|-id=641 bgcolor=#E9E9E9
| 105641 ||  || — || September 23, 2000 || Socorro || LINEAR || — || align=right | 6.8 km || 
|-id=642 bgcolor=#d6d6d6
| 105642 ||  || — || September 23, 2000 || Socorro || LINEAR || — || align=right | 4.3 km || 
|-id=643 bgcolor=#d6d6d6
| 105643 ||  || — || September 23, 2000 || Socorro || LINEAR || — || align=right | 5.3 km || 
|-id=644 bgcolor=#d6d6d6
| 105644 ||  || — || September 23, 2000 || Socorro || LINEAR || EOS || align=right | 4.7 km || 
|-id=645 bgcolor=#d6d6d6
| 105645 ||  || — || September 23, 2000 || Socorro || LINEAR || — || align=right | 4.5 km || 
|-id=646 bgcolor=#fefefe
| 105646 ||  || — || September 24, 2000 || Socorro || LINEAR || FLO || align=right | 1.3 km || 
|-id=647 bgcolor=#d6d6d6
| 105647 ||  || — || September 20, 2000 || Haleakala || NEAT || — || align=right | 4.7 km || 
|-id=648 bgcolor=#fefefe
| 105648 ||  || — || September 25, 2000 || Višnjan Observatory || K. Korlević || NYS || align=right | 1.0 km || 
|-id=649 bgcolor=#d6d6d6
| 105649 ||  || — || September 20, 2000 || Cordell-Lorenz || D. T. Durig, A. D. McDermott || EUP || align=right | 11 km || 
|-id=650 bgcolor=#fefefe
| 105650 ||  || — || September 22, 2000 || Socorro || LINEAR || H || align=right | 1.2 km || 
|-id=651 bgcolor=#fefefe
| 105651 ||  || — || September 24, 2000 || Socorro || LINEAR || H || align=right | 1.6 km || 
|-id=652 bgcolor=#d6d6d6
| 105652 ||  || — || September 26, 2000 || Bisei SG Center || BATTeRS || EOS || align=right | 3.9 km || 
|-id=653 bgcolor=#d6d6d6
| 105653 ||  || — || September 23, 2000 || Socorro || LINEAR || EOS || align=right | 3.8 km || 
|-id=654 bgcolor=#C2FFFF
| 105654 ||  || — || September 23, 2000 || Socorro || LINEAR || L5slow || align=right | 14 km || 
|-id=655 bgcolor=#d6d6d6
| 105655 ||  || — || September 23, 2000 || Socorro || LINEAR || — || align=right | 5.3 km || 
|-id=656 bgcolor=#d6d6d6
| 105656 ||  || — || September 23, 2000 || Socorro || LINEAR || — || align=right | 6.7 km || 
|-id=657 bgcolor=#d6d6d6
| 105657 ||  || — || September 23, 2000 || Socorro || LINEAR || — || align=right | 5.9 km || 
|-id=658 bgcolor=#d6d6d6
| 105658 ||  || — || September 24, 2000 || Socorro || LINEAR || — || align=right | 5.3 km || 
|-id=659 bgcolor=#d6d6d6
| 105659 ||  || — || September 24, 2000 || Socorro || LINEAR || KOR || align=right | 2.5 km || 
|-id=660 bgcolor=#d6d6d6
| 105660 ||  || — || September 24, 2000 || Socorro || LINEAR || — || align=right | 4.0 km || 
|-id=661 bgcolor=#d6d6d6
| 105661 ||  || — || September 24, 2000 || Socorro || LINEAR || — || align=right | 4.2 km || 
|-id=662 bgcolor=#E9E9E9
| 105662 ||  || — || September 24, 2000 || Socorro || LINEAR || — || align=right | 5.1 km || 
|-id=663 bgcolor=#d6d6d6
| 105663 ||  || — || September 24, 2000 || Socorro || LINEAR || HYG || align=right | 5.5 km || 
|-id=664 bgcolor=#fefefe
| 105664 ||  || — || September 24, 2000 || Socorro || LINEAR || — || align=right | 1.7 km || 
|-id=665 bgcolor=#d6d6d6
| 105665 ||  || — || September 24, 2000 || Socorro || LINEAR || — || align=right | 7.3 km || 
|-id=666 bgcolor=#d6d6d6
| 105666 ||  || — || September 24, 2000 || Socorro || LINEAR || — || align=right | 3.5 km || 
|-id=667 bgcolor=#d6d6d6
| 105667 ||  || — || September 24, 2000 || Socorro || LINEAR || HYG || align=right | 5.5 km || 
|-id=668 bgcolor=#fefefe
| 105668 ||  || — || September 24, 2000 || Socorro || LINEAR || — || align=right | 1.9 km || 
|-id=669 bgcolor=#fefefe
| 105669 ||  || — || September 24, 2000 || Socorro || LINEAR || — || align=right | 1.8 km || 
|-id=670 bgcolor=#d6d6d6
| 105670 ||  || — || September 24, 2000 || Socorro || LINEAR || — || align=right | 7.0 km || 
|-id=671 bgcolor=#fefefe
| 105671 ||  || — || September 24, 2000 || Socorro || LINEAR || — || align=right | 2.6 km || 
|-id=672 bgcolor=#d6d6d6
| 105672 ||  || — || September 24, 2000 || Socorro || LINEAR || KAR || align=right | 2.5 km || 
|-id=673 bgcolor=#d6d6d6
| 105673 ||  || — || September 26, 2000 || Višnjan Observatory || K. Korlević || MEL || align=right | 6.9 km || 
|-id=674 bgcolor=#FA8072
| 105674 ||  || — || September 25, 2000 || Anderson Mesa || LONEOS || — || align=right | 1.9 km || 
|-id=675 bgcolor=#d6d6d6
| 105675 Kamiukena ||  ||  || September 26, 2000 || Kuma Kogen || A. Nakamura || — || align=right | 4.2 km || 
|-id=676 bgcolor=#fefefe
| 105676 ||  || — || September 23, 2000 || Bergisch Gladbach || W. Bickel || FLO || align=right | 1.4 km || 
|-id=677 bgcolor=#d6d6d6
| 105677 ||  || — || September 23, 2000 || Bergisch Gladbach || W. Bickel || EOS || align=right | 3.6 km || 
|-id=678 bgcolor=#d6d6d6
| 105678 ||  || — || September 23, 2000 || Socorro || LINEAR || — || align=right | 5.6 km || 
|-id=679 bgcolor=#E9E9E9
| 105679 ||  || — || September 23, 2000 || Socorro || LINEAR || — || align=right | 4.1 km || 
|-id=680 bgcolor=#E9E9E9
| 105680 ||  || — || September 23, 2000 || Socorro || LINEAR || EUN || align=right | 3.7 km || 
|-id=681 bgcolor=#d6d6d6
| 105681 ||  || — || September 23, 2000 || Socorro || LINEAR || — || align=right | 9.0 km || 
|-id=682 bgcolor=#E9E9E9
| 105682 ||  || — || September 23, 2000 || Socorro || LINEAR || — || align=right | 5.3 km || 
|-id=683 bgcolor=#E9E9E9
| 105683 ||  || — || September 23, 2000 || Socorro || LINEAR || — || align=right | 5.5 km || 
|-id=684 bgcolor=#fefefe
| 105684 ||  || — || September 23, 2000 || Socorro || LINEAR || V || align=right data-sort-value="0.98" | 980 m || 
|-id=685 bgcolor=#C2FFFF
| 105685 ||  || — || September 23, 2000 || Socorro || LINEAR || L5 || align=right | 19 km || 
|-id=686 bgcolor=#d6d6d6
| 105686 ||  || — || September 23, 2000 || Socorro || LINEAR || HYG || align=right | 6.3 km || 
|-id=687 bgcolor=#d6d6d6
| 105687 ||  || — || September 24, 2000 || Socorro || LINEAR || — || align=right | 5.8 km || 
|-id=688 bgcolor=#fefefe
| 105688 ||  || — || September 24, 2000 || Socorro || LINEAR || — || align=right | 1.4 km || 
|-id=689 bgcolor=#d6d6d6
| 105689 ||  || — || September 24, 2000 || Socorro || LINEAR || EOS || align=right | 3.8 km || 
|-id=690 bgcolor=#d6d6d6
| 105690 ||  || — || September 24, 2000 || Socorro || LINEAR || — || align=right | 3.3 km || 
|-id=691 bgcolor=#d6d6d6
| 105691 ||  || — || September 24, 2000 || Socorro || LINEAR || THM || align=right | 6.5 km || 
|-id=692 bgcolor=#d6d6d6
| 105692 ||  || — || September 24, 2000 || Socorro || LINEAR || THM || align=right | 7.0 km || 
|-id=693 bgcolor=#d6d6d6
| 105693 ||  || — || September 24, 2000 || Socorro || LINEAR || — || align=right | 5.1 km || 
|-id=694 bgcolor=#C2FFFF
| 105694 ||  || — || September 24, 2000 || Socorro || LINEAR || L5 || align=right | 23 km || 
|-id=695 bgcolor=#fefefe
| 105695 ||  || — || September 24, 2000 || Socorro || LINEAR || NYS || align=right | 1.5 km || 
|-id=696 bgcolor=#fefefe
| 105696 ||  || — || September 24, 2000 || Socorro || LINEAR || — || align=right | 2.9 km || 
|-id=697 bgcolor=#fefefe
| 105697 ||  || — || September 24, 2000 || Socorro || LINEAR || — || align=right | 1.5 km || 
|-id=698 bgcolor=#d6d6d6
| 105698 ||  || — || September 24, 2000 || Socorro || LINEAR || — || align=right | 7.6 km || 
|-id=699 bgcolor=#fefefe
| 105699 ||  || — || September 24, 2000 || Socorro || LINEAR || MAS || align=right | 2.1 km || 
|-id=700 bgcolor=#fefefe
| 105700 ||  || — || September 24, 2000 || Socorro || LINEAR || NYS || align=right | 1.2 km || 
|}

105701–105800 

|-bgcolor=#d6d6d6
| 105701 ||  || — || September 24, 2000 || Socorro || LINEAR || — || align=right | 3.4 km || 
|-id=702 bgcolor=#fefefe
| 105702 ||  || — || September 24, 2000 || Socorro || LINEAR || NYS || align=right | 1.3 km || 
|-id=703 bgcolor=#d6d6d6
| 105703 ||  || — || September 24, 2000 || Socorro || LINEAR || KOR || align=right | 2.6 km || 
|-id=704 bgcolor=#d6d6d6
| 105704 ||  || — || September 24, 2000 || Socorro || LINEAR || — || align=right | 4.7 km || 
|-id=705 bgcolor=#d6d6d6
| 105705 ||  || — || September 24, 2000 || Socorro || LINEAR || — || align=right | 6.7 km || 
|-id=706 bgcolor=#d6d6d6
| 105706 ||  || — || September 24, 2000 || Socorro || LINEAR || — || align=right | 5.3 km || 
|-id=707 bgcolor=#d6d6d6
| 105707 ||  || — || September 24, 2000 || Socorro || LINEAR || HYG || align=right | 5.8 km || 
|-id=708 bgcolor=#d6d6d6
| 105708 ||  || — || September 24, 2000 || Socorro || LINEAR || THM || align=right | 5.0 km || 
|-id=709 bgcolor=#fefefe
| 105709 ||  || — || September 24, 2000 || Socorro || LINEAR || FLO || align=right | 1.4 km || 
|-id=710 bgcolor=#d6d6d6
| 105710 ||  || — || September 24, 2000 || Socorro || LINEAR || — || align=right | 6.4 km || 
|-id=711 bgcolor=#d6d6d6
| 105711 ||  || — || September 24, 2000 || Socorro || LINEAR || — || align=right | 5.1 km || 
|-id=712 bgcolor=#fefefe
| 105712 ||  || — || September 24, 2000 || Socorro || LINEAR || — || align=right | 1.7 km || 
|-id=713 bgcolor=#d6d6d6
| 105713 ||  || — || September 24, 2000 || Socorro || LINEAR || — || align=right | 12 km || 
|-id=714 bgcolor=#d6d6d6
| 105714 ||  || — || September 24, 2000 || Socorro || LINEAR || HYG || align=right | 5.3 km || 
|-id=715 bgcolor=#d6d6d6
| 105715 ||  || — || September 24, 2000 || Socorro || LINEAR || ITH || align=right | 2.3 km || 
|-id=716 bgcolor=#d6d6d6
| 105716 ||  || — || September 24, 2000 || Socorro || LINEAR || — || align=right | 9.6 km || 
|-id=717 bgcolor=#fefefe
| 105717 ||  || — || September 24, 2000 || Socorro || LINEAR || — || align=right | 1.7 km || 
|-id=718 bgcolor=#d6d6d6
| 105718 ||  || — || September 24, 2000 || Socorro || LINEAR || — || align=right | 3.7 km || 
|-id=719 bgcolor=#d6d6d6
| 105719 ||  || — || September 24, 2000 || Socorro || LINEAR || KOR || align=right | 2.7 km || 
|-id=720 bgcolor=#C2FFFF
| 105720 ||  || — || September 24, 2000 || Socorro || LINEAR || L5 || align=right | 17 km || 
|-id=721 bgcolor=#fefefe
| 105721 ||  || — || September 24, 2000 || Socorro || LINEAR || FLO || align=right | 1.4 km || 
|-id=722 bgcolor=#fefefe
| 105722 ||  || — || September 24, 2000 || Socorro || LINEAR || NYS || align=right | 1.2 km || 
|-id=723 bgcolor=#fefefe
| 105723 ||  || — || September 24, 2000 || Socorro || LINEAR || — || align=right | 1.9 km || 
|-id=724 bgcolor=#fefefe
| 105724 ||  || — || September 24, 2000 || Socorro || LINEAR || — || align=right | 1.6 km || 
|-id=725 bgcolor=#d6d6d6
| 105725 ||  || — || September 24, 2000 || Socorro || LINEAR || — || align=right | 8.6 km || 
|-id=726 bgcolor=#d6d6d6
| 105726 ||  || — || September 24, 2000 || Socorro || LINEAR || — || align=right | 4.4 km || 
|-id=727 bgcolor=#d6d6d6
| 105727 ||  || — || September 24, 2000 || Socorro || LINEAR || — || align=right | 5.8 km || 
|-id=728 bgcolor=#d6d6d6
| 105728 ||  || — || September 24, 2000 || Socorro || LINEAR || ELF || align=right | 10 km || 
|-id=729 bgcolor=#d6d6d6
| 105729 ||  || — || September 24, 2000 || Socorro || LINEAR || — || align=right | 4.8 km || 
|-id=730 bgcolor=#d6d6d6
| 105730 ||  || — || September 24, 2000 || Socorro || LINEAR || — || align=right | 6.9 km || 
|-id=731 bgcolor=#fefefe
| 105731 ||  || — || September 24, 2000 || Socorro || LINEAR || NYS || align=right | 1.3 km || 
|-id=732 bgcolor=#d6d6d6
| 105732 ||  || — || September 24, 2000 || Socorro || LINEAR || — || align=right | 4.4 km || 
|-id=733 bgcolor=#fefefe
| 105733 ||  || — || September 24, 2000 || Socorro || LINEAR || — || align=right | 1.7 km || 
|-id=734 bgcolor=#d6d6d6
| 105734 ||  || — || September 24, 2000 || Socorro || LINEAR || — || align=right | 3.5 km || 
|-id=735 bgcolor=#fefefe
| 105735 ||  || — || September 24, 2000 || Socorro || LINEAR || V || align=right | 1.2 km || 
|-id=736 bgcolor=#E9E9E9
| 105736 ||  || — || September 24, 2000 || Socorro || LINEAR || — || align=right | 4.8 km || 
|-id=737 bgcolor=#fefefe
| 105737 ||  || — || September 24, 2000 || Socorro || LINEAR || — || align=right | 1.8 km || 
|-id=738 bgcolor=#d6d6d6
| 105738 ||  || — || September 24, 2000 || Socorro || LINEAR || — || align=right | 6.2 km || 
|-id=739 bgcolor=#fefefe
| 105739 ||  || — || September 25, 2000 || Socorro || LINEAR || V || align=right | 1.8 km || 
|-id=740 bgcolor=#E9E9E9
| 105740 ||  || — || September 22, 2000 || Socorro || LINEAR || WAT || align=right | 5.0 km || 
|-id=741 bgcolor=#d6d6d6
| 105741 ||  || — || September 27, 2000 || Socorro || LINEAR || TIR || align=right | 6.4 km || 
|-id=742 bgcolor=#d6d6d6
| 105742 ||  || — || September 22, 2000 || Socorro || LINEAR || ALA || align=right | 7.4 km || 
|-id=743 bgcolor=#d6d6d6
| 105743 ||  || — || September 22, 2000 || Socorro || LINEAR || — || align=right | 8.8 km || 
|-id=744 bgcolor=#d6d6d6
| 105744 ||  || — || September 23, 2000 || Socorro || LINEAR || — || align=right | 5.8 km || 
|-id=745 bgcolor=#E9E9E9
| 105745 ||  || — || September 23, 2000 || Socorro || LINEAR || — || align=right | 6.8 km || 
|-id=746 bgcolor=#C2FFFF
| 105746 ||  || — || September 23, 2000 || Socorro || LINEAR || L5 || align=right | 14 km || 
|-id=747 bgcolor=#d6d6d6
| 105747 ||  || — || September 23, 2000 || Socorro || LINEAR || — || align=right | 5.3 km || 
|-id=748 bgcolor=#d6d6d6
| 105748 ||  || — || September 23, 2000 || Socorro || LINEAR || — || align=right | 6.5 km || 
|-id=749 bgcolor=#d6d6d6
| 105749 ||  || — || September 23, 2000 || Socorro || LINEAR || EOS || align=right | 4.0 km || 
|-id=750 bgcolor=#fefefe
| 105750 ||  || — || September 23, 2000 || Socorro || LINEAR || V || align=right | 1.2 km || 
|-id=751 bgcolor=#fefefe
| 105751 ||  || — || September 23, 2000 || Socorro || LINEAR || — || align=right | 1.4 km || 
|-id=752 bgcolor=#fefefe
| 105752 ||  || — || September 23, 2000 || Socorro || LINEAR || V || align=right | 1.6 km || 
|-id=753 bgcolor=#d6d6d6
| 105753 ||  || — || September 23, 2000 || Socorro || LINEAR || — || align=right | 3.2 km || 
|-id=754 bgcolor=#d6d6d6
| 105754 ||  || — || September 23, 2000 || Socorro || LINEAR || EOS || align=right | 5.4 km || 
|-id=755 bgcolor=#fefefe
| 105755 ||  || — || September 23, 2000 || Socorro || LINEAR || — || align=right | 1.5 km || 
|-id=756 bgcolor=#d6d6d6
| 105756 ||  || — || September 23, 2000 || Socorro || LINEAR || — || align=right | 5.5 km || 
|-id=757 bgcolor=#d6d6d6
| 105757 ||  || — || September 23, 2000 || Socorro || LINEAR || URS || align=right | 8.5 km || 
|-id=758 bgcolor=#d6d6d6
| 105758 ||  || — || September 23, 2000 || Socorro || LINEAR || — || align=right | 10 km || 
|-id=759 bgcolor=#E9E9E9
| 105759 ||  || — || September 24, 2000 || Socorro || LINEAR || — || align=right | 6.5 km || 
|-id=760 bgcolor=#fefefe
| 105760 ||  || — || September 24, 2000 || Socorro || LINEAR || MAS || align=right | 1.5 km || 
|-id=761 bgcolor=#d6d6d6
| 105761 ||  || — || September 24, 2000 || Socorro || LINEAR || — || align=right | 3.8 km || 
|-id=762 bgcolor=#E9E9E9
| 105762 ||  || — || September 24, 2000 || Socorro || LINEAR || — || align=right | 1.8 km || 
|-id=763 bgcolor=#fefefe
| 105763 ||  || — || September 24, 2000 || Socorro || LINEAR || — || align=right data-sort-value="0.98" | 980 m || 
|-id=764 bgcolor=#fefefe
| 105764 ||  || — || September 24, 2000 || Socorro || LINEAR || — || align=right | 1.4 km || 
|-id=765 bgcolor=#d6d6d6
| 105765 ||  || — || September 24, 2000 || Socorro || LINEAR || HYG || align=right | 5.4 km || 
|-id=766 bgcolor=#E9E9E9
| 105766 ||  || — || September 24, 2000 || Socorro || LINEAR || GEF || align=right | 2.8 km || 
|-id=767 bgcolor=#d6d6d6
| 105767 ||  || — || September 24, 2000 || Socorro || LINEAR || — || align=right | 6.4 km || 
|-id=768 bgcolor=#d6d6d6
| 105768 ||  || — || September 24, 2000 || Socorro || LINEAR || NAE || align=right | 6.7 km || 
|-id=769 bgcolor=#fefefe
| 105769 ||  || — || September 24, 2000 || Socorro || LINEAR || — || align=right | 2.9 km || 
|-id=770 bgcolor=#d6d6d6
| 105770 ||  || — || September 24, 2000 || Socorro || LINEAR || — || align=right | 3.5 km || 
|-id=771 bgcolor=#d6d6d6
| 105771 ||  || — || September 24, 2000 || Socorro || LINEAR || — || align=right | 4.7 km || 
|-id=772 bgcolor=#d6d6d6
| 105772 ||  || — || September 24, 2000 || Socorro || LINEAR || EMA || align=right | 6.7 km || 
|-id=773 bgcolor=#d6d6d6
| 105773 ||  || — || September 24, 2000 || Socorro || LINEAR || EOS || align=right | 4.0 km || 
|-id=774 bgcolor=#d6d6d6
| 105774 ||  || — || September 24, 2000 || Socorro || LINEAR || THM || align=right | 5.5 km || 
|-id=775 bgcolor=#E9E9E9
| 105775 ||  || — || September 24, 2000 || Socorro || LINEAR || — || align=right | 1.6 km || 
|-id=776 bgcolor=#d6d6d6
| 105776 ||  || — || September 24, 2000 || Socorro || LINEAR || — || align=right | 5.7 km || 
|-id=777 bgcolor=#d6d6d6
| 105777 ||  || — || September 24, 2000 || Socorro || LINEAR || — || align=right | 7.6 km || 
|-id=778 bgcolor=#fefefe
| 105778 ||  || — || September 24, 2000 || Socorro || LINEAR || NYS || align=right | 1.4 km || 
|-id=779 bgcolor=#d6d6d6
| 105779 ||  || — || September 24, 2000 || Socorro || LINEAR || — || align=right | 4.8 km || 
|-id=780 bgcolor=#fefefe
| 105780 ||  || — || September 24, 2000 || Socorro || LINEAR || — || align=right | 1.5 km || 
|-id=781 bgcolor=#d6d6d6
| 105781 ||  || — || September 24, 2000 || Socorro || LINEAR || — || align=right | 6.0 km || 
|-id=782 bgcolor=#d6d6d6
| 105782 ||  || — || September 24, 2000 || Socorro || LINEAR || — || align=right | 4.1 km || 
|-id=783 bgcolor=#d6d6d6
| 105783 ||  || — || September 24, 2000 || Socorro || LINEAR || — || align=right | 6.1 km || 
|-id=784 bgcolor=#d6d6d6
| 105784 ||  || — || September 24, 2000 || Socorro || LINEAR || THM || align=right | 6.0 km || 
|-id=785 bgcolor=#d6d6d6
| 105785 ||  || — || September 24, 2000 || Socorro || LINEAR || — || align=right | 6.3 km || 
|-id=786 bgcolor=#fefefe
| 105786 ||  || — || September 24, 2000 || Socorro || LINEAR || fast? || align=right | 1.2 km || 
|-id=787 bgcolor=#fefefe
| 105787 ||  || — || September 24, 2000 || Socorro || LINEAR || FLO || align=right | 1.6 km || 
|-id=788 bgcolor=#d6d6d6
| 105788 ||  || — || September 24, 2000 || Socorro || LINEAR || — || align=right | 8.5 km || 
|-id=789 bgcolor=#d6d6d6
| 105789 ||  || — || September 24, 2000 || Socorro || LINEAR || — || align=right | 7.6 km || 
|-id=790 bgcolor=#fefefe
| 105790 ||  || — || September 24, 2000 || Socorro || LINEAR || — || align=right | 1.7 km || 
|-id=791 bgcolor=#d6d6d6
| 105791 ||  || — || September 24, 2000 || Socorro || LINEAR || — || align=right | 5.0 km || 
|-id=792 bgcolor=#d6d6d6
| 105792 ||  || — || September 24, 2000 || Socorro || LINEAR || URS || align=right | 7.8 km || 
|-id=793 bgcolor=#d6d6d6
| 105793 ||  || — || September 24, 2000 || Socorro || LINEAR || — || align=right | 3.8 km || 
|-id=794 bgcolor=#fefefe
| 105794 ||  || — || September 24, 2000 || Socorro || LINEAR || — || align=right | 2.4 km || 
|-id=795 bgcolor=#d6d6d6
| 105795 ||  || — || September 24, 2000 || Socorro || LINEAR || HYG || align=right | 6.5 km || 
|-id=796 bgcolor=#d6d6d6
| 105796 ||  || — || September 24, 2000 || Socorro || LINEAR || — || align=right | 7.3 km || 
|-id=797 bgcolor=#d6d6d6
| 105797 ||  || — || September 24, 2000 || Socorro || LINEAR || — || align=right | 6.1 km || 
|-id=798 bgcolor=#fefefe
| 105798 ||  || — || September 24, 2000 || Socorro || LINEAR || — || align=right | 1.9 km || 
|-id=799 bgcolor=#d6d6d6
| 105799 ||  || — || September 24, 2000 || Socorro || LINEAR || — || align=right | 8.2 km || 
|-id=800 bgcolor=#fefefe
| 105800 ||  || — || September 24, 2000 || Socorro || LINEAR || — || align=right | 3.8 km || 
|}

105801–105900 

|-bgcolor=#d6d6d6
| 105801 ||  || — || September 24, 2000 || Socorro || LINEAR || — || align=right | 3.9 km || 
|-id=802 bgcolor=#d6d6d6
| 105802 ||  || — || September 24, 2000 || Socorro || LINEAR || — || align=right | 3.4 km || 
|-id=803 bgcolor=#C2FFFF
| 105803 ||  || — || September 22, 2000 || Socorro || LINEAR || L5 || align=right | 16 km || 
|-id=804 bgcolor=#d6d6d6
| 105804 ||  || — || September 23, 2000 || Socorro || LINEAR || — || align=right | 6.2 km || 
|-id=805 bgcolor=#d6d6d6
| 105805 ||  || — || September 23, 2000 || Socorro || LINEAR || — || align=right | 9.7 km || 
|-id=806 bgcolor=#d6d6d6
| 105806 ||  || — || September 23, 2000 || Socorro || LINEAR || — || align=right | 4.1 km || 
|-id=807 bgcolor=#d6d6d6
| 105807 ||  || — || September 23, 2000 || Socorro || LINEAR || TIR || align=right | 5.4 km || 
|-id=808 bgcolor=#C2FFFF
| 105808 ||  || — || September 23, 2000 || Socorro || LINEAR || L5 || align=right | 24 km || 
|-id=809 bgcolor=#d6d6d6
| 105809 ||  || — || September 23, 2000 || Socorro || LINEAR || HYG || align=right | 4.9 km || 
|-id=810 bgcolor=#d6d6d6
| 105810 ||  || — || September 23, 2000 || Socorro || LINEAR || — || align=right | 3.6 km || 
|-id=811 bgcolor=#d6d6d6
| 105811 ||  || — || September 23, 2000 || Socorro || LINEAR || EOS || align=right | 4.3 km || 
|-id=812 bgcolor=#fefefe
| 105812 ||  || — || September 23, 2000 || Socorro || LINEAR || — || align=right | 2.2 km || 
|-id=813 bgcolor=#E9E9E9
| 105813 ||  || — || September 23, 2000 || Socorro || LINEAR || AGN || align=right | 3.4 km || 
|-id=814 bgcolor=#d6d6d6
| 105814 ||  || — || September 23, 2000 || Socorro || LINEAR || — || align=right | 5.5 km || 
|-id=815 bgcolor=#fefefe
| 105815 ||  || — || September 23, 2000 || Socorro || LINEAR || V || align=right | 1.4 km || 
|-id=816 bgcolor=#fefefe
| 105816 ||  || — || September 23, 2000 || Socorro || LINEAR || V || align=right | 1.4 km || 
|-id=817 bgcolor=#d6d6d6
| 105817 ||  || — || September 23, 2000 || Socorro || LINEAR || — || align=right | 4.1 km || 
|-id=818 bgcolor=#d6d6d6
| 105818 ||  || — || September 23, 2000 || Socorro || LINEAR || HYG || align=right | 7.2 km || 
|-id=819 bgcolor=#d6d6d6
| 105819 ||  || — || September 23, 2000 || Socorro || LINEAR || — || align=right | 6.2 km || 
|-id=820 bgcolor=#d6d6d6
| 105820 ||  || — || September 23, 2000 || Socorro || LINEAR || — || align=right | 5.3 km || 
|-id=821 bgcolor=#d6d6d6
| 105821 ||  || — || September 23, 2000 || Socorro || LINEAR || EUP || align=right | 10 km || 
|-id=822 bgcolor=#d6d6d6
| 105822 ||  || — || September 23, 2000 || Socorro || LINEAR || — || align=right | 3.6 km || 
|-id=823 bgcolor=#d6d6d6
| 105823 ||  || — || September 23, 2000 || Socorro || LINEAR || — || align=right | 7.4 km || 
|-id=824 bgcolor=#d6d6d6
| 105824 ||  || — || September 24, 2000 || Socorro || LINEAR || THM || align=right | 4.3 km || 
|-id=825 bgcolor=#fefefe
| 105825 ||  || — || September 24, 2000 || Socorro || LINEAR || — || align=right | 2.4 km || 
|-id=826 bgcolor=#d6d6d6
| 105826 ||  || — || September 24, 2000 || Socorro || LINEAR || — || align=right | 5.0 km || 
|-id=827 bgcolor=#d6d6d6
| 105827 ||  || — || September 24, 2000 || Socorro || LINEAR || — || align=right | 3.6 km || 
|-id=828 bgcolor=#d6d6d6
| 105828 ||  || — || September 24, 2000 || Socorro || LINEAR || — || align=right | 4.6 km || 
|-id=829 bgcolor=#d6d6d6
| 105829 ||  || — || September 24, 2000 || Socorro || LINEAR || — || align=right | 4.7 km || 
|-id=830 bgcolor=#fefefe
| 105830 ||  || — || September 24, 2000 || Socorro || LINEAR || FLO || align=right data-sort-value="0.97" | 970 m || 
|-id=831 bgcolor=#d6d6d6
| 105831 ||  || — || September 24, 2000 || Socorro || LINEAR || EOS || align=right | 5.6 km || 
|-id=832 bgcolor=#fefefe
| 105832 ||  || — || September 24, 2000 || Socorro || LINEAR || — || align=right | 1.7 km || 
|-id=833 bgcolor=#d6d6d6
| 105833 ||  || — || September 24, 2000 || Socorro || LINEAR || — || align=right | 2.8 km || 
|-id=834 bgcolor=#d6d6d6
| 105834 ||  || — || September 24, 2000 || Socorro || LINEAR || — || align=right | 7.1 km || 
|-id=835 bgcolor=#d6d6d6
| 105835 ||  || — || September 24, 2000 || Socorro || LINEAR || HYG || align=right | 6.7 km || 
|-id=836 bgcolor=#d6d6d6
| 105836 ||  || — || September 24, 2000 || Socorro || LINEAR || EOS || align=right | 4.9 km || 
|-id=837 bgcolor=#d6d6d6
| 105837 ||  || — || September 24, 2000 || Socorro || LINEAR || — || align=right | 2.8 km || 
|-id=838 bgcolor=#d6d6d6
| 105838 ||  || — || September 24, 2000 || Socorro || LINEAR || THM || align=right | 4.5 km || 
|-id=839 bgcolor=#d6d6d6
| 105839 ||  || — || September 24, 2000 || Socorro || LINEAR || — || align=right | 4.9 km || 
|-id=840 bgcolor=#d6d6d6
| 105840 ||  || — || September 24, 2000 || Socorro || LINEAR || — || align=right | 7.8 km || 
|-id=841 bgcolor=#fefefe
| 105841 ||  || — || September 24, 2000 || Socorro || LINEAR || — || align=right | 1.2 km || 
|-id=842 bgcolor=#d6d6d6
| 105842 ||  || — || September 24, 2000 || Socorro || LINEAR || THM || align=right | 5.8 km || 
|-id=843 bgcolor=#fefefe
| 105843 ||  || — || September 22, 2000 || Socorro || LINEAR || H || align=right | 1.7 km || 
|-id=844 bgcolor=#fefefe
| 105844 ||  || — || September 27, 2000 || Socorro || LINEAR || H || align=right | 1.1 km || 
|-id=845 bgcolor=#d6d6d6
| 105845 ||  || — || September 27, 2000 || Bisei SG Center || BATTeRS || — || align=right | 2.4 km || 
|-id=846 bgcolor=#fefefe
| 105846 ||  || — || September 25, 2000 || Socorro || LINEAR || H || align=right | 1.4 km || 
|-id=847 bgcolor=#d6d6d6
| 105847 ||  || — || September 23, 2000 || Socorro || LINEAR || — || align=right | 4.5 km || 
|-id=848 bgcolor=#d6d6d6
| 105848 ||  || — || September 23, 2000 || Socorro || LINEAR || — || align=right | 6.4 km || 
|-id=849 bgcolor=#d6d6d6
| 105849 ||  || — || September 23, 2000 || Socorro || LINEAR || EOS || align=right | 4.6 km || 
|-id=850 bgcolor=#d6d6d6
| 105850 ||  || — || September 23, 2000 || Socorro || LINEAR || — || align=right | 6.5 km || 
|-id=851 bgcolor=#d6d6d6
| 105851 ||  || — || September 23, 2000 || Socorro || LINEAR || — || align=right | 6.7 km || 
|-id=852 bgcolor=#d6d6d6
| 105852 ||  || — || September 23, 2000 || Socorro || LINEAR || — || align=right | 6.4 km || 
|-id=853 bgcolor=#d6d6d6
| 105853 ||  || — || September 23, 2000 || Socorro || LINEAR || — || align=right | 6.4 km || 
|-id=854 bgcolor=#d6d6d6
| 105854 ||  || — || September 23, 2000 || Socorro || LINEAR || VER || align=right | 6.9 km || 
|-id=855 bgcolor=#d6d6d6
| 105855 ||  || — || September 23, 2000 || Socorro || LINEAR || — || align=right | 3.9 km || 
|-id=856 bgcolor=#d6d6d6
| 105856 ||  || — || September 23, 2000 || Socorro || LINEAR || — || align=right | 7.8 km || 
|-id=857 bgcolor=#d6d6d6
| 105857 ||  || — || September 23, 2000 || Socorro || LINEAR || HYG || align=right | 7.2 km || 
|-id=858 bgcolor=#fefefe
| 105858 ||  || — || September 24, 2000 || Socorro || LINEAR || — || align=right | 2.0 km || 
|-id=859 bgcolor=#d6d6d6
| 105859 ||  || — || September 24, 2000 || Socorro || LINEAR || LIX || align=right | 7.5 km || 
|-id=860 bgcolor=#d6d6d6
| 105860 ||  || — || September 24, 2000 || Socorro || LINEAR || — || align=right | 4.9 km || 
|-id=861 bgcolor=#d6d6d6
| 105861 ||  || — || September 24, 2000 || Socorro || LINEAR || HYG || align=right | 5.7 km || 
|-id=862 bgcolor=#d6d6d6
| 105862 ||  || — || September 24, 2000 || Socorro || LINEAR || — || align=right | 4.1 km || 
|-id=863 bgcolor=#fefefe
| 105863 ||  || — || September 24, 2000 || Socorro || LINEAR || — || align=right | 1.6 km || 
|-id=864 bgcolor=#d6d6d6
| 105864 ||  || — || September 24, 2000 || Socorro || LINEAR || LIX || align=right | 6.8 km || 
|-id=865 bgcolor=#d6d6d6
| 105865 ||  || — || September 24, 2000 || Socorro || LINEAR || — || align=right | 6.1 km || 
|-id=866 bgcolor=#d6d6d6
| 105866 ||  || — || September 24, 2000 || Socorro || LINEAR || — || align=right | 5.8 km || 
|-id=867 bgcolor=#d6d6d6
| 105867 ||  || — || September 26, 2000 || Socorro || LINEAR || — || align=right | 8.0 km || 
|-id=868 bgcolor=#E9E9E9
| 105868 ||  || — || September 28, 2000 || Socorro || LINEAR || — || align=right | 6.8 km || 
|-id=869 bgcolor=#d6d6d6
| 105869 ||  || — || September 28, 2000 || Socorro || LINEAR || ALA || align=right | 11 km || 
|-id=870 bgcolor=#d6d6d6
| 105870 ||  || — || September 28, 2000 || Socorro || LINEAR || — || align=right | 4.0 km || 
|-id=871 bgcolor=#d6d6d6
| 105871 ||  || — || September 28, 2000 || Socorro || LINEAR || — || align=right | 3.4 km || 
|-id=872 bgcolor=#fefefe
| 105872 ||  || — || September 28, 2000 || Socorro || LINEAR || — || align=right | 1.7 km || 
|-id=873 bgcolor=#d6d6d6
| 105873 ||  || — || September 28, 2000 || Socorro || LINEAR || EOS || align=right | 4.6 km || 
|-id=874 bgcolor=#fefefe
| 105874 ||  || — || September 28, 2000 || Socorro || LINEAR || V || align=right | 1.2 km || 
|-id=875 bgcolor=#d6d6d6
| 105875 ||  || — || September 28, 2000 || Socorro || LINEAR || — || align=right | 6.8 km || 
|-id=876 bgcolor=#d6d6d6
| 105876 ||  || — || September 28, 2000 || Socorro || LINEAR || — || align=right | 9.5 km || 
|-id=877 bgcolor=#d6d6d6
| 105877 ||  || — || September 28, 2000 || Socorro || LINEAR || — || align=right | 5.0 km || 
|-id=878 bgcolor=#fefefe
| 105878 ||  || — || September 28, 2000 || Socorro || LINEAR || — || align=right | 2.1 km || 
|-id=879 bgcolor=#d6d6d6
| 105879 ||  || — || September 28, 2000 || Socorro || LINEAR || EOS || align=right | 4.7 km || 
|-id=880 bgcolor=#fefefe
| 105880 ||  || — || September 28, 2000 || Socorro || LINEAR || H || align=right | 1.4 km || 
|-id=881 bgcolor=#d6d6d6
| 105881 ||  || — || September 28, 2000 || Socorro || LINEAR || — || align=right | 5.8 km || 
|-id=882 bgcolor=#d6d6d6
| 105882 ||  || — || September 28, 2000 || Socorro || LINEAR || EOS || align=right | 4.9 km || 
|-id=883 bgcolor=#fefefe
| 105883 ||  || — || September 28, 2000 || Socorro || LINEAR || — || align=right | 1.6 km || 
|-id=884 bgcolor=#d6d6d6
| 105884 ||  || — || September 28, 2000 || Socorro || LINEAR || — || align=right | 5.7 km || 
|-id=885 bgcolor=#d6d6d6
| 105885 ||  || — || September 17, 2000 || Kvistaberg || UDAS || EOS || align=right | 3.9 km || 
|-id=886 bgcolor=#d6d6d6
| 105886 ||  || — || September 19, 2000 || Haleakala || NEAT || — || align=right | 2.8 km || 
|-id=887 bgcolor=#E9E9E9
| 105887 ||  || — || September 20, 2000 || Socorro || LINEAR || — || align=right | 5.4 km || 
|-id=888 bgcolor=#d6d6d6
| 105888 ||  || — || September 20, 2000 || Kitt Peak || Spacewatch || — || align=right | 6.8 km || 
|-id=889 bgcolor=#fefefe
| 105889 ||  || — || September 20, 2000 || Kitt Peak || Spacewatch || — || align=right | 1.4 km || 
|-id=890 bgcolor=#d6d6d6
| 105890 ||  || — || September 20, 2000 || Kitt Peak || Spacewatch || KOR || align=right | 3.6 km || 
|-id=891 bgcolor=#d6d6d6
| 105891 ||  || — || September 20, 2000 || Kitt Peak || Spacewatch || — || align=right | 3.8 km || 
|-id=892 bgcolor=#fefefe
| 105892 ||  || — || September 20, 2000 || Haleakala || NEAT || FLO || align=right | 1.2 km || 
|-id=893 bgcolor=#d6d6d6
| 105893 ||  || — || September 20, 2000 || Kitt Peak || Spacewatch || — || align=right | 5.6 km || 
|-id=894 bgcolor=#fefefe
| 105894 ||  || — || September 20, 2000 || Haleakala || NEAT || FLO || align=right | 2.9 km || 
|-id=895 bgcolor=#d6d6d6
| 105895 ||  || — || September 21, 2000 || Haleakala || NEAT || — || align=right | 5.5 km || 
|-id=896 bgcolor=#C2FFFF
| 105896 ||  || — || September 21, 2000 || Haleakala || NEAT || L5 || align=right | 14 km || 
|-id=897 bgcolor=#d6d6d6
| 105897 ||  || — || September 21, 2000 || Haleakala || NEAT || TEL || align=right | 3.7 km || 
|-id=898 bgcolor=#d6d6d6
| 105898 ||  || — || September 21, 2000 || Haleakala || NEAT || KOR || align=right | 3.0 km || 
|-id=899 bgcolor=#d6d6d6
| 105899 ||  || — || September 22, 2000 || Kitt Peak || Spacewatch || — || align=right | 6.3 km || 
|-id=900 bgcolor=#fefefe
| 105900 ||  || — || September 23, 2000 || Socorro || LINEAR || — || align=right | 2.0 km || 
|}

105901–106000 

|-bgcolor=#C2FFFF
| 105901 ||  || — || September 24, 2000 || Socorro || LINEAR || L5 || align=right | 16 km || 
|-id=902 bgcolor=#fefefe
| 105902 ||  || — || September 24, 2000 || Kitt Peak || Spacewatch || NYS || align=right | 1.3 km || 
|-id=903 bgcolor=#E9E9E9
| 105903 ||  || — || September 24, 2000 || Socorro || LINEAR || AST || align=right | 2.9 km || 
|-id=904 bgcolor=#C2FFFF
| 105904 ||  || — || September 24, 2000 || Socorro || LINEAR || L5 || align=right | 13 km || 
|-id=905 bgcolor=#d6d6d6
| 105905 ||  || — || September 24, 2000 || Socorro || LINEAR || — || align=right | 4.4 km || 
|-id=906 bgcolor=#d6d6d6
| 105906 ||  || — || September 24, 2000 || Socorro || LINEAR || EOS || align=right | 3.2 km || 
|-id=907 bgcolor=#d6d6d6
| 105907 ||  || — || September 24, 2000 || Socorro || LINEAR || — || align=right | 5.0 km || 
|-id=908 bgcolor=#d6d6d6
| 105908 ||  || — || September 24, 2000 || Socorro || LINEAR || — || align=right | 4.1 km || 
|-id=909 bgcolor=#fefefe
| 105909 ||  || — || September 24, 2000 || Socorro || LINEAR || — || align=right | 2.8 km || 
|-id=910 bgcolor=#d6d6d6
| 105910 ||  || — || September 24, 2000 || Socorro || LINEAR || — || align=right | 3.5 km || 
|-id=911 bgcolor=#d6d6d6
| 105911 ||  || — || September 24, 2000 || Socorro || LINEAR || — || align=right | 6.1 km || 
|-id=912 bgcolor=#d6d6d6
| 105912 ||  || — || September 24, 2000 || Socorro || LINEAR || — || align=right | 7.1 km || 
|-id=913 bgcolor=#d6d6d6
| 105913 ||  || — || September 24, 2000 || Socorro || LINEAR || HYG || align=right | 5.7 km || 
|-id=914 bgcolor=#d6d6d6
| 105914 ||  || — || September 24, 2000 || Socorro || LINEAR || — || align=right | 3.4 km || 
|-id=915 bgcolor=#d6d6d6
| 105915 ||  || — || September 24, 2000 || Socorro || LINEAR || — || align=right | 3.9 km || 
|-id=916 bgcolor=#d6d6d6
| 105916 ||  || — || September 24, 2000 || Socorro || LINEAR || — || align=right | 4.3 km || 
|-id=917 bgcolor=#d6d6d6
| 105917 ||  || — || September 24, 2000 || Socorro || LINEAR || — || align=right | 5.5 km || 
|-id=918 bgcolor=#fefefe
| 105918 ||  || — || September 25, 2000 || Socorro || LINEAR || — || align=right | 1.3 km || 
|-id=919 bgcolor=#d6d6d6
| 105919 ||  || — || September 25, 2000 || Socorro || LINEAR || — || align=right | 7.7 km || 
|-id=920 bgcolor=#fefefe
| 105920 ||  || — || September 25, 2000 || Socorro || LINEAR || — || align=right | 2.1 km || 
|-id=921 bgcolor=#d6d6d6
| 105921 ||  || — || September 25, 2000 || Socorro || LINEAR || — || align=right | 7.8 km || 
|-id=922 bgcolor=#d6d6d6
| 105922 ||  || — || September 25, 2000 || Socorro || LINEAR || — || align=right | 5.1 km || 
|-id=923 bgcolor=#d6d6d6
| 105923 ||  || — || September 25, 2000 || Socorro || LINEAR || — || align=right | 4.7 km || 
|-id=924 bgcolor=#d6d6d6
| 105924 ||  || — || September 25, 2000 || Socorro || LINEAR || — || align=right | 3.6 km || 
|-id=925 bgcolor=#fefefe
| 105925 ||  || — || September 25, 2000 || Socorro || LINEAR || V || align=right | 1.2 km || 
|-id=926 bgcolor=#d6d6d6
| 105926 ||  || — || September 26, 2000 || Socorro || LINEAR || — || align=right | 3.8 km || 
|-id=927 bgcolor=#d6d6d6
| 105927 ||  || — || September 26, 2000 || Socorro || LINEAR || — || align=right | 7.4 km || 
|-id=928 bgcolor=#d6d6d6
| 105928 ||  || — || September 26, 2000 || Socorro || LINEAR || — || align=right | 6.1 km || 
|-id=929 bgcolor=#fefefe
| 105929 ||  || — || September 26, 2000 || Socorro || LINEAR || — || align=right | 1.9 km || 
|-id=930 bgcolor=#d6d6d6
| 105930 ||  || — || September 26, 2000 || Socorro || LINEAR || URS || align=right | 4.2 km || 
|-id=931 bgcolor=#d6d6d6
| 105931 ||  || — || September 27, 2000 || Socorro || LINEAR || — || align=right | 5.3 km || 
|-id=932 bgcolor=#d6d6d6
| 105932 ||  || — || September 27, 2000 || Socorro || LINEAR || — || align=right | 4.5 km || 
|-id=933 bgcolor=#d6d6d6
| 105933 ||  || — || September 27, 2000 || Socorro || LINEAR || THM || align=right | 4.1 km || 
|-id=934 bgcolor=#d6d6d6
| 105934 ||  || — || September 27, 2000 || Socorro || LINEAR || — || align=right | 4.9 km || 
|-id=935 bgcolor=#d6d6d6
| 105935 ||  || — || September 27, 2000 || Socorro || LINEAR || 3:2 || align=right | 11 km || 
|-id=936 bgcolor=#d6d6d6
| 105936 ||  || — || September 27, 2000 || Socorro || LINEAR || — || align=right | 3.3 km || 
|-id=937 bgcolor=#d6d6d6
| 105937 ||  || — || September 27, 2000 || Socorro || LINEAR || — || align=right | 5.2 km || 
|-id=938 bgcolor=#d6d6d6
| 105938 ||  || — || September 27, 2000 || Socorro || LINEAR || HYG || align=right | 4.5 km || 
|-id=939 bgcolor=#fefefe
| 105939 ||  || — || September 28, 2000 || Socorro || LINEAR || ERI || align=right | 4.3 km || 
|-id=940 bgcolor=#fefefe
| 105940 ||  || — || September 28, 2000 || Socorro || LINEAR || MAS || align=right | 1.6 km || 
|-id=941 bgcolor=#fefefe
| 105941 ||  || — || September 28, 2000 || Socorro || LINEAR || — || align=right | 1.3 km || 
|-id=942 bgcolor=#fefefe
| 105942 ||  || — || September 21, 2000 || Socorro || LINEAR || FLO || align=right data-sort-value="0.83" | 830 m || 
|-id=943 bgcolor=#FA8072
| 105943 ||  || — || September 21, 2000 || Socorro || LINEAR || — || align=right | 1.5 km || 
|-id=944 bgcolor=#fefefe
| 105944 ||  || — || September 24, 2000 || Socorro || LINEAR || — || align=right | 1.7 km || 
|-id=945 bgcolor=#d6d6d6
| 105945 ||  || — || September 25, 2000 || Socorro || LINEAR || EOS || align=right | 3.6 km || 
|-id=946 bgcolor=#d6d6d6
| 105946 ||  || — || September 26, 2000 || Socorro || LINEAR || — || align=right | 6.5 km || 
|-id=947 bgcolor=#fefefe
| 105947 ||  || — || September 25, 2000 || Socorro || LINEAR || H || align=right | 1.5 km || 
|-id=948 bgcolor=#fefefe
| 105948 ||  || — || September 28, 2000 || Socorro || LINEAR || H || align=right data-sort-value="0.77" | 770 m || 
|-id=949 bgcolor=#d6d6d6
| 105949 ||  || — || September 24, 2000 || Socorro || LINEAR || — || align=right | 3.1 km || 
|-id=950 bgcolor=#E9E9E9
| 105950 ||  || — || September 24, 2000 || Socorro || LINEAR || AGN || align=right | 2.7 km || 
|-id=951 bgcolor=#fefefe
| 105951 ||  || — || September 24, 2000 || Socorro || LINEAR || V || align=right | 1.3 km || 
|-id=952 bgcolor=#fefefe
| 105952 ||  || — || September 24, 2000 || Socorro || LINEAR || NYS || align=right | 1.3 km || 
|-id=953 bgcolor=#E9E9E9
| 105953 ||  || — || September 24, 2000 || Socorro || LINEAR || — || align=right | 5.6 km || 
|-id=954 bgcolor=#d6d6d6
| 105954 ||  || — || September 24, 2000 || Socorro || LINEAR || — || align=right | 5.5 km || 
|-id=955 bgcolor=#E9E9E9
| 105955 ||  || — || September 24, 2000 || Socorro || LINEAR || — || align=right | 5.5 km || 
|-id=956 bgcolor=#d6d6d6
| 105956 ||  || — || September 24, 2000 || Socorro || LINEAR || EOS || align=right | 3.6 km || 
|-id=957 bgcolor=#d6d6d6
| 105957 ||  || — || September 24, 2000 || Socorro || LINEAR || — || align=right | 5.5 km || 
|-id=958 bgcolor=#fefefe
| 105958 ||  || — || September 24, 2000 || Socorro || LINEAR || V || align=right | 1.6 km || 
|-id=959 bgcolor=#fefefe
| 105959 ||  || — || September 24, 2000 || Socorro || LINEAR || — || align=right | 1.6 km || 
|-id=960 bgcolor=#d6d6d6
| 105960 ||  || — || September 24, 2000 || Socorro || LINEAR || HYG || align=right | 5.5 km || 
|-id=961 bgcolor=#d6d6d6
| 105961 ||  || — || September 24, 2000 || Socorro || LINEAR || — || align=right | 5.4 km || 
|-id=962 bgcolor=#d6d6d6
| 105962 ||  || — || September 24, 2000 || Socorro || LINEAR || — || align=right | 5.8 km || 
|-id=963 bgcolor=#d6d6d6
| 105963 ||  || — || September 24, 2000 || Socorro || LINEAR || — || align=right | 8.1 km || 
|-id=964 bgcolor=#E9E9E9
| 105964 ||  || — || September 24, 2000 || Socorro || LINEAR || — || align=right | 1.6 km || 
|-id=965 bgcolor=#d6d6d6
| 105965 ||  || — || September 24, 2000 || Socorro || LINEAR || — || align=right | 5.8 km || 
|-id=966 bgcolor=#E9E9E9
| 105966 ||  || — || September 24, 2000 || Socorro || LINEAR || — || align=right | 1.9 km || 
|-id=967 bgcolor=#fefefe
| 105967 ||  || — || September 24, 2000 || Socorro || LINEAR || — || align=right | 2.7 km || 
|-id=968 bgcolor=#d6d6d6
| 105968 ||  || — || September 24, 2000 || Socorro || LINEAR || — || align=right | 6.6 km || 
|-id=969 bgcolor=#d6d6d6
| 105969 ||  || — || September 24, 2000 || Socorro || LINEAR || — || align=right | 3.5 km || 
|-id=970 bgcolor=#d6d6d6
| 105970 ||  || — || September 25, 2000 || Socorro || LINEAR || — || align=right | 6.2 km || 
|-id=971 bgcolor=#fefefe
| 105971 ||  || — || September 25, 2000 || Socorro || LINEAR || — || align=right | 1.8 km || 
|-id=972 bgcolor=#fefefe
| 105972 ||  || — || September 26, 2000 || Socorro || LINEAR || NYS || align=right | 1.4 km || 
|-id=973 bgcolor=#d6d6d6
| 105973 ||  || — || September 26, 2000 || Socorro || LINEAR || — || align=right | 7.4 km || 
|-id=974 bgcolor=#d6d6d6
| 105974 ||  || — || September 26, 2000 || Socorro || LINEAR || — || align=right | 2.9 km || 
|-id=975 bgcolor=#fefefe
| 105975 ||  || — || September 26, 2000 || Socorro || LINEAR || FLO || align=right | 2.1 km || 
|-id=976 bgcolor=#d6d6d6
| 105976 ||  || — || September 26, 2000 || Socorro || LINEAR || — || align=right | 5.8 km || 
|-id=977 bgcolor=#fefefe
| 105977 ||  || — || September 26, 2000 || Socorro || LINEAR || FLO || align=right | 3.1 km || 
|-id=978 bgcolor=#d6d6d6
| 105978 ||  || — || September 26, 2000 || Socorro || LINEAR || — || align=right | 5.5 km || 
|-id=979 bgcolor=#d6d6d6
| 105979 ||  || — || September 26, 2000 || Socorro || LINEAR || — || align=right | 7.1 km || 
|-id=980 bgcolor=#d6d6d6
| 105980 ||  || — || September 27, 2000 || Socorro || LINEAR || EOS || align=right | 3.1 km || 
|-id=981 bgcolor=#d6d6d6
| 105981 ||  || — || September 27, 2000 || Socorro || LINEAR || — || align=right | 5.5 km || 
|-id=982 bgcolor=#d6d6d6
| 105982 ||  || — || September 27, 2000 || Socorro || LINEAR || — || align=right | 6.1 km || 
|-id=983 bgcolor=#fefefe
| 105983 ||  || — || September 27, 2000 || Socorro || LINEAR || FLO || align=right | 2.2 km || 
|-id=984 bgcolor=#fefefe
| 105984 ||  || — || September 27, 2000 || Socorro || LINEAR || — || align=right | 1.4 km || 
|-id=985 bgcolor=#E9E9E9
| 105985 ||  || — || September 27, 2000 || Socorro || LINEAR || — || align=right | 2.5 km || 
|-id=986 bgcolor=#d6d6d6
| 105986 ||  || — || September 27, 2000 || Socorro || LINEAR || — || align=right | 6.3 km || 
|-id=987 bgcolor=#fefefe
| 105987 ||  || — || September 27, 2000 || Socorro || LINEAR || MAS || align=right | 1.3 km || 
|-id=988 bgcolor=#d6d6d6
| 105988 ||  || — || September 27, 2000 || Socorro || LINEAR || — || align=right | 6.2 km || 
|-id=989 bgcolor=#d6d6d6
| 105989 ||  || — || September 27, 2000 || Socorro || LINEAR || — || align=right | 6.0 km || 
|-id=990 bgcolor=#d6d6d6
| 105990 ||  || — || September 28, 2000 || Socorro || LINEAR || — || align=right | 8.0 km || 
|-id=991 bgcolor=#fefefe
| 105991 ||  || — || September 28, 2000 || Socorro || LINEAR || EUT || align=right | 1.4 km || 
|-id=992 bgcolor=#d6d6d6
| 105992 ||  || — || September 28, 2000 || Socorro || LINEAR || URS || align=right | 11 km || 
|-id=993 bgcolor=#d6d6d6
| 105993 ||  || — || September 30, 2000 || Socorro || LINEAR || — || align=right | 7.4 km || 
|-id=994 bgcolor=#d6d6d6
| 105994 ||  || — || September 30, 2000 || Socorro || LINEAR || ALA || align=right | 8.5 km || 
|-id=995 bgcolor=#d6d6d6
| 105995 ||  || — || September 30, 2000 || Socorro || LINEAR || HYG || align=right | 7.5 km || 
|-id=996 bgcolor=#fefefe
| 105996 ||  || — || September 26, 2000 || Socorro || LINEAR || H || align=right | 1.2 km || 
|-id=997 bgcolor=#d6d6d6
| 105997 ||  || — || September 23, 2000 || Socorro || LINEAR || EOS || align=right | 3.9 km || 
|-id=998 bgcolor=#d6d6d6
| 105998 ||  || — || September 23, 2000 || Socorro || LINEAR || — || align=right | 6.5 km || 
|-id=999 bgcolor=#d6d6d6
| 105999 ||  || — || September 23, 2000 || Socorro || LINEAR || ALA || align=right | 5.5 km || 
|-id=000 bgcolor=#d6d6d6
| 106000 ||  || — || September 23, 2000 || Socorro || LINEAR || — || align=right | 5.0 km || 
|}

References

External links 
 Discovery Circumstances: Numbered Minor Planets (105001)–(110000) (IAU Minor Planet Center)

0105